The 1918 New Year Honours were appointments by King George V to various orders and honours to reward and highlight good works by citizens of the British Empire. The appointments were published in The London Gazette and The Times in January, February and March 1918.

Unlike the 1917 New Year Honours, the 1918 honours included a long list of new knights bachelor and baronets, but again the list was dominated by rewards for war efforts. As The Times reported: "The New Year Honours represent largely the circumstances of war, and, perhaps, as usual, they also reflect human nature in an obvious form. The list is one of the rare opportunities for the public to scan the names of soldiers who have distinguished themselves in service."

The recipients of the Order of the British Empire were not classified as being within Military or Civilian divisions until following the war.

The recipients of honours are displayed here as they were styled before their new honour, and arranged by honour, with classes (Knight, Knight Grand Cross, etc.) and then divisions (Military, Civil, etc.) as appropriate.

United Kingdom and British Empire

Viscount
 Marmaduke, Baron  Furness, by the name, style, and title of Viscount Furness, of Grantley, in the West Riding of the county of York.

Baron
The Rt. Hon. Sir Frederick Cawley, Baronet, Chancellor of the Duchy of Lancasterby the name, style and title of Baron Cawley, of Prestwich, in the county Palatine of Lancaster.
Sir John Brownlee Lonsdale, Baronet, by the name, style and title of Baron Armaghdale, of Armagh, in the County of Armagh.
Almeric Hugh Paget, by the name, style and title of Baron Queenborough, of Queenborough, in the County of Kent.
Sir James Thomas Woodhouse  by the name, style and title of Baron Terrington, of Hudderefield, in the County of York.

 Privy Councillor 
The King appointed the following to His Majesty's Most Honourable Privy Council:

Lord Hugh Cecil  
Sir Henry Craik 
Sir Gordon Hewart 
Major Sir Henry Norman 
Tom Richards  
Lord Edmund Talbot 

 Baronetcies 
Dunbar Plunket Barton, Judge of the High Court of Justice in Ireland, of Fethard, in the parish of Fethard, in the county of Tipperary.
Alec Black, of Louth Park, in the county of Lincoln, Esquire.
Edward Tootal Broadhurst, of Manchester, in the County Palatine of Lancaster, Esquire.
James Craig , of Craigavon, in the County of Down, Esquire.
Thomas Cope, of Osbaston Hall, in the parish of Market Bosworth, in the County of Leicester, Esquire.
The Rt. Hon. Sir Henry Dalziel , of Brooklands, Chobham in the county of Surrey, Knight.
Alfred Herbert Dixon, of Warford in the county of Chester, Esquire.
The Rt. Hon. Ellis Jones Ellis-Griffith , of Llanidan, in the county of Anglesey, one of His Majesty's Counsel learned in the Law.
Herbert James Huntington-Whiteley , of Grimley, in the county of Worcester, Esquire.
Sir Joseph Lawrence. 
John Leigh, of Altrincham, in the county of Chester, Esquire.
Frederick William Lewis, of Essendon Place, in the parish of Essendon, in the county of Hertford, Esquire.
Sir Francis William Lowe  of Edgbaston, in the City of Birmingham, Knight.
Sir George Allardyce Riddell  of Walton Heath, in the County of Surrey, Knight.
Sir James Ritchie, Lord Mayor of London. (His name already appeared in some works of reference as a baronet, and his inclusion in the present honours list is intended to regularize an informality in the previous title.)
The Rt. Hon. Sir Frederick Edwin Smith 
Colonel Alexander Sprot , of Garnkirk in the county of Lanark.
John Stewart-Clark , of Dundas, in West Lothian, Esquire.
Thomas Edward Watson , Esquire
John Wood, of Hengrave, in the parish of Hengrave, in the county of Suffolk, Esquire.

Knight Bachelor

Robert N. Anderson, Mayor of Derry and a member of the Irish Convention.
William Nicholas Atkinson, lately Divisional Inspector of Mines.
Dr. Barclay Josiah Baron, Lord Mayor of Bristol.
James Bird, Clerk of the London County Council
James Boyton, .
Edmond Browne.
Robert Bruce, Editor of The Glasgow Herald.
James Campbell, Chairman of the North of Scotland College of Agriculture.
Emsley Carr, Editor and part proprietor of the News of the World.
William Henry Clemmey, Mayor of Bootle.
David S. Davies, formerly High Sheriff of Denbighshire; Chairman of the County Appeal Tribunal and Pensions Committee. 
Arthur Fell, .
S. Archibald Garland, Mayor of Chichester 1912–18.
Charles Henry Gibbs.
Ernest W. Glover.
William Henry Hadow, MA, MusDoc,  Principal of Armstrong College, Newcastle upon Tyne.
Anthony Hope Hawkins.
Thomas Jeeves Horder, MD.
John Morris-Jones, MA, Professor of Welsh at the University College of North Wales, Bangor.
William F. Jury.
John Scott Keltie, .
John Lavery, .
John Lithiby, Legal Adviser to the Local Government Board.
Sidney James Low, MA, Lecturer on Imperial and Colonial History, University of London.
George Lunn, Lord Mayor of Newcastle-upon-Tyne.
Edwin Landseer Lutyens, .
James William McCraith, of Nottingham.
Charles Mandleberg.
Thomas Rogerson Marsden, of Oldham.
Henry Milner-White, LLB, of Southampton.
Alpheus Cleophas Morton, .
Edward M. Mountain.
David Murray, President of the Royal Institute of Painters in Water Colours.
Herbert Nield, Recorder of York.
James George Owen, Mayor of Exeter.
John Phillips, MD FRCP, Professor Emeritus of Obstetric Medicine, King's College, London.
Edmund Bampfylde Phipps, late General Secretary to the Ministry of Munitions.
Philip Edward Pilditch.
Thomas Putnam, of Darlington.
Stephen B. Quin, Mayor of Limerick.
Patrick Rose-Innes, .
William Watson Rutherford, .
William Henry Seager, Vice-Chairman of the Cardiff and Bristol Channel Shipowners' Association.
Robert Russell Simpson, of Edinburgh. Writer to the Signet.
George Frederick Sleight, of Grimsby.
Arthur Spurgeon, .
Lieutenant-Colonel Harold Jalland Stiles, RAMC.
Edmund Stonehouse, Mayor of Wakefield. 
Henry Tozer, Alderman of the City of Westminster.
Leslie Ward.
Howard Kingsley Wood.
Alfred William Yeo, .

British India
Arthur Robert Anderson, 
Edward Fairless Barber, Additional Member of the Council of the Governor of Madras for making Laws and Regulations
Thomas William Birkett, of Bombay
Colonel Harry Albert Lawless Hepper, (Major, Royal Engineers, retired).
Thomas Frederick Dawson-Miller, Chief Justice of the High Court of Judicature at Patna
Binod Chunder Mitter, Barrister-at-Law, lately Officiating Advocate General, Bengal, and a Member of the Council of the Governor for making Laws and Regulations
Henry Adolphus Byden Rattigan, Chief Judge of Chief Court, Punjab

Colonies, Protectorates, etc.
Major Andrew Macphail, Canadian Army Medical Corps (Overseas Forces), Professor of the History of Medicine, McGill University, Montreal
Major-General Donald Alexander Macdonald, Quartmaster-General, Canadian Militia
Admiral Charles Edmund Kingsmill,  (Retired), Director of Naval Service in the Dominion of Canada
William James Gage, of Toronto
The Hon. Charles Gregory Wade, Agent-General in London for the State of New South Wales
Frederick William Young, LLB, Agent General in London for the State of South Australia
The Hon. Simon Fraser, formerly a Member of the Senate of the Commonwealth of Australia
The Hon. William Fraser, Minister of Public Works of the Dominion of New Zealand
John Robert Sinclair, representative of New Zealand on the Royal Commission on the Natural Resources, Trade and Legislation of certain portions of His Majesty's Dominions
The Hon. John Carnegie Dove-Wilson, LLB, Judge President, Natal Provincial Division, Supreme Court of South Africa
Major William Northrup McMillan, 25th (Service) Battalion, The Royal Fusiliers
Bartle Henry Temple Frere, the Chief Justice of Gibraltar

 Victoria Cross (VC) 

Major (acting Lieutenant-Colonel) John Sherwood-Kelly, Norfolk Regiment, commanded A Battalion, Royal Inniskilling Fusiliers.
Captain (acting Major) George Randolph Pearkes, Canadian Mounted Rifles.
Captain John Fox Russell, late RAMC, attached Royal Welsh Fusiliers.
Lieutenant (temporary Captain) Robert Gee, Royal Fusiliers.
Lieutenant (acting Captain) Christopher Patrick John O'Kelly, Canadian Infantry
2nd Lieutenant (acting Lieutenant-Colonel) Philip Eric Bent, late Leicestershire Regiment.
2nd Lieutenant (acting Captain) Arthur Moore Lascelles, Durham Light Infantry.
No. 10153 Sergeant John MacAulay, Scots Guards (Stirling).
No. 51339 Sergeant George Harry Mullin, Canadian Infantry.
No. 9522 Sergeant Charles Edward Spackman, Border Regiment (Fulham).
No. 404017 Corporal Colin Barron, Canadian Infantry.
No. 240171 Lance Corporal Robert McBeath, Seaforth Highlanders (Kinlochbervie, Lairg, Sutherland).
No. 6657 Private George William Clare, late Lancers (Plumstead).
No. 838301 Private Thomas William Holmes, Canadian Mounted Rifles.
No. 437793 Private Cecil John Kinross, Canadian Infantry.
No. 24213 Private Henry James Nicholas, New Zealand Infantry. 
No. 552665 Private James Peter Robertson, late Canadian Infantry.
No. 2008 Lance Dafadar Gobind Singh, Indian Cavalry.

 The Most Honourable Order of the Bath 

 Knight Grand Cross of the Order of the Bath (GCB) 

 Military Division 
Army
General Sir Herbert Charles Onslow Plumer, General

Indian Army
General Sir Robert Irvin Scallon, 

Honorary Knight Grand Cross 
Honorary Lieutenant-General His Highness Maharaja Bahadur, Sir Partab Singh,  of Jodhpur.

 Knight Commander of the Order of the Bath (KCB) 

 Military Division 
Royal Navy
Vice-Admiral Sir Cecil Fiennes Thursby, 
Rear-Admiral Alexander Ludovic Duff,  
Colonel (temporary Major-General) David Mercer, Royal Marine Light Infantry

Army
Major-General (temporary Lieutenant-General) James Aylmer Lowthorpe Haldane,  
Major-General (temporary Lieutenant-General) Alexander Hamilton Gordon,  
Major-General (temporary Lieutenant-General)  Herbert Edward Watts, 
Lieutenant-General George Francis Milne,  
Major-General Edmund Guy Tulloch Bainbridge,  
Major-General Hugh Montague Trenchard,  
Major-General William Bernard Hickie,  
Major-General Sydney Turing Barlow Lawford,  
Major-General The Hon. William Lambton,  
Major-General George Montague Harper,  
Lieutenant-General Frederick Rudolph Lambart, Earl of Cavan, 
Major-General (temporary Lieutenant-General)  Arthur Edward Aveling Holland,  
Major-General Harold Bridgwood Walker,  
Major-General Charles Patrick Amyatt Hull,  
Major-General Victor Arthur Couper,  
Lieutenant-General Henry Merrick Lawson,  
Surgeon-General Sir David Bruce, MB, retired pay,  late Army Medical Service
Major-General (temporary Lieutenant-General) Edward Stanislaus Bulfin,  Colonel Yorkshire Regiment 
Major-General (temporary Lieutenant-General) Sir Philip Walhouse Chetwode, 

Australian Imperial Force
Major-General John Monash,  
Colonel (temporary Major-General) Joseph John Talbot Hobbs, 

Canadian Force
Colonel (temporary Lieutenant-General)  Sir Arthur William Currie,  
Colonel (temporary Major-General) David Watson, 
Major-General (temporary Lieutenant-General) Sir Richard Ernest William Turner, General Officer Commanding Canadian Forces in the United Kingdom

New Zealand Force
Temporary Major-General Sir Andrew Hamilton Russell, 

South African Force
Honorary Colonel (temporary Major-General) Henry Timson Lukin, 

Honorary Knight Commander
Honorary Major-General His Highness Maharaja Sir Ganga Singh Bahadur, of Bikaner.

 Civil Division 

Surgeon-General William Henry Norman, 
Engineer Vice-Admiral George Goodwin Goodwin,  
Surgeon-General George Lenthal Cheatle, 
Paymaster-in-Chief John Henry George Chapple, 
Honorary Colonel Thomas Ainslie Lunham, late Cork Royal Garrison Artillery Militia
Alfred Daniel Hall, Secretary to the Board of Agriculture
Sir George Newman Edin. Principal Medical Officer to the Board of Education

 Companion of the Order of the Bath (CB) 

 Military Division 
Royal Navy
Rear-Admiral Thomas Dawson Lees Sheppard, 
Rear-Admiral James Andrew Fergusson
Rear-Admiral Allen Thomas Hunt, 
Rear-Admiral Vivian Henry Gerald Bernard
Rear-Admiral Edmund Hyde Parker
Captain George Holmes Borrett, 
Captain George Henry Baird
Captain Edward Reeves
Captain Thomas Drummond Pratt
Captain William Wordsworth Fisher, 
Captain Robert Nesham Bax 
Captain William Henry Dudley Boyle

Army
Surgeon-General Richard Henry Stewart Sawyer,  MB, retired pay, late Army Medical Service
Major-General Reginald Byng Stephens, 
Major-General Herbert Crofton Campbell Uniacke, 
Major-General Philip Geoffrey Twining, 
Major-General William Charles Giffard Heneker, 
Major-General (temporary Lieutenant-General) Thomas Herbert John Chapman Goodwin,  Director-General, Army Medical Service 
Colonel and Honorary Brigadier-General Cecil Vernon Wingfield-Stratford, 
Colonel Robert Hammill Firth, Army Medical Service
Colonel (temporary Brigadier-General) Ernest Reuben Charles Butler,  
Colonel and Honorary Surgeon-General Bruce Morland Skinner, Army Medical Service
Lieutenant-Colonel and Brevet Colonel (temporary Colonel) Frederick Smith, retired pay, late Royal Army Medical Service
Colonel (temporary Brigadier-General) William John Chesshyre Butler (retired pay), Reserve of Officers
Col. Richard Orlando Kellett 
Col. Thomas Wyatt Hale  Army Ordnance Depot
Col. Herbert de Touffreville Phillips 
Surg.-Gen. Henry Neville Thompson  Army Medical Service
Col. Colquhoun Scott Dodgson 
Col. Edwin Henry de Vere Atkinson 
Lt.-Col. and Bt. Col. James Wilfred Stirling  Royal Arty.
Col. Percy Agnew Bainbridge  Army Ordnance Depot
Col. Anthony John Luther, Army Medical Service
Col. James Matthew Forrest Shine, Army Medical Service
Col. James Barnett Wilson  Army Medical Service
Col. Foster Reuss Newland  Army Medical Service
Col. Hugh Champneys Thurston  Army Medical Service
Col. Hugh Gilbert Casson 
Col. Cecil Lothian Nicholson 
Col. The Hon. Charles Strathavon Heathcote-Drummond-Willoughby  Reserve of Ofc.s
Hon. Col. Charles Loftus Bates  Yeomanry
Tmp Col. Alfred Herbert Tubby  Army Medical Service
Tmp Col. Sidney Maynard Smith  Army Medical Service
Lt.-Col. and Bt. Col. Cecil Edward Pereira  Coldstream Guards
Maj. and Bt. Col. Seymour Hulbert Sheppard  Royal Engineers
Lt.-Col. and Bt. Col. John Ponsonby  Coldstream Guards
Lt.-Col. and Bt. Col. Edward Douglas, Lord Loch  Grenadier Guards
Lt.-Col. and Bt. Col. Hamilton Lyster Reed  Royal Arty.
Lt.-Col. and Bt. Col. Edward Henry Willis  Royal Arty.
Lt.-Col. and Bt. Col. Robert James Bridgford  Shropshire Light Inf.
Lt.-Col. and Bt. Col. The Hon. John Francis Gathorne-Hardy  Grenadier Guards
Maj. and Bt. Col. Arthur Crawford Daly, West Yorkshire Reg.
Maj. and Bt. Col. James Ronald Edmondstone Charles  Royal Engineers
Lt.-Col. and Bt. Col. Alexander Ernest Wardrop  Royal Arty.
Maj. and Bt. Col. Warren Hastings Anderson, Cheshire Reg.
Lt.-Col. and Bt. Col. Arthur Ernest John Perkins, Royal Arty.
Lt.-Col. and Bt. Col. Frederick Cuthbert Poole  Royal Arty.
Maj. and Bt. Col. Thomas Herbert Shoubridge  Northumberland Fusiliers
Lt.-Col. and Bt. Col. John Campbell  Cameron Highlanders
Lt.-Col. and Bt. Col. Cyril Maxwell Ross-Johnson  Royal Arty.
Lt.-Col. and Bt. Col. John Guy Rotton  Royal Arty.
Lt.-Col. and Bt. Col. Edward Spencer Hoare Nairne  Royal Arty.
Lt.-Col. and Bt.-Col. Percy Orr Hazelton  Army Service Corps
Lt.-Col. and Bt. Col. Hugo Douglas de Pree  Royal Arty.
Lt.-Col. and Bt. Col. Henry Hugh Tudor  Royal Arty.
Lt.-Col. and Bt. Col. Hugh Maude de Fellenberg Montgomery, Royal Arty.
Maj. and Bt. Col. Nelson Graham Anderson  Army Service Corps
Lt.-Col. and Bt. Col. George Jasper Farmar  Worcestershire Reg.
Lt.-Col. and Bt. Col. Harry Dudley Ossulston Ward  Royal Arty.
Lt.-Col. and Bt. Col. George Sidney Clive  Grenadier Guards
Lt.-Col. and Bt. Col. Ben Atkinson  Royal Arty.
Lt.-Col. and Bt. Col. Percy Pollexfen de Blaquiere Radcliffe  Royal Arty.
Lt.-Col. and Bt. Col. Alexander Anderson McHardy  Royal Arty.
Lt.-Col. and Bt. Col. Julian McCarty Steele  Coldstream Guards
Maj. and Bt. Col. Samuel Herbert Wilson  Royal Engineers
Lt.-Col. and Bt. Col. Charles William Gwynn  Royal Engineers
Maj. and Bt. Col. Cyril John Deverell, West Yorkshire Reg.
Lt.-Col. and Bt. Col. Louis James Lipsett  Royal Irish Reg.
Lt.-Col. and Bt. Col. Neville John Gordon Cameron  Cameron Highlanders
Lt.-Col. and Bt. Col. Robert Clement Gore  Argyll and Sutherland Highlanders
Maj. and Bt. Col. Bartholomew George Price  Royal Fusiliers
Lt.-Col. and Hon. Col. Charles Joseph Trimble  Reserve
Lt.-Col. Arthur Russell Aldridge  RAMC
Lt.-Col. Wilfred Spedding Swabey  Army Service Corps
Lt.-Col. Edward Charles Massy  Royal Arty.
Lt.-Col. Percy Douglas Hamilton  Royal Arty.
Lt.-Col. Charles William Compton  Somerset Light Inf.
Tmp Lt.-Col. Alexander Gibb, Royal Engineers
Maj. and Bt. Lt.-Col. Hugh Jamieson Elles  Royal Engineers, and Tank Corps
Maj. Stanley Fielder Mott, King's Royal Rifle Corps
Maj. James Gilbert Shaw Mellor 
Tmp Brig.-Gen.-General Raymond de Candolle, Special List
Col. Alexander Dunstan Sharp  RAMC
Lt.-Col. Thomas Finlayson Dewar, RAMC
Surg.-Gen. Francis John Jencken  Army Medical Services
Col. Stewart Dalrymple Cleeve, late Royal Engineers
Lt.-Col. and Bt. Col. Arthur James Kelly, late Royal Engineers
Col. Bridges George Lewis 
Col. Reynell Hamilton Bayley Taylor, Army Ordnance Depot
Col. Frederick Charles Lloyd
Col. Richard William Breeks
Col. George Francis Henry le Breton-Simmons
Col. Geoffrey Dominic Close, Royal Engineers
Col. Dudley Howard Ridout 
Col. William Coates  RAMC
Col. Arthur Cecil Currie 
Lt.-Col. and Bt. Col. Meade James Crosbie-Dennis, Royal Arty.
Col. Claude John Perceval  Royal Arty.
Col. George Fraser Phillips 
Lt.-Col. and Hon. Col. William Charles Wright (retired), Royal Arty.
Maj. and Bt. Col. Robert Hutchison  Dragoon Guards
Tmp Col. Howard Henry Tooth  Army Medical Service
Maj. and Bt. Col. Basil Ferguson Burnett-Hitchcock  Nottinghamshire and Derbyshire Reg.
Lt.-Col. William George Sackville Benson, Army Pay Dept.
Lt.-Col. Achilles Samut  Army Ordnance Depot
Lt.-Col. Reginald Seward Ruston, Army Pay Dept.
Lt.-Col. and Bt. Col. Julian John Leverson  late Royal Engineers
Tmp Honorary Lt.-Col. George Seaton Buchanan  RAMC
Maj. and Bt. Lt.-Col. Harry Osborne Mance  Royal Engineers
Tmp Lt.-Col. Andrew Balfour  RAMC
Maj. and Bt. Lt.-Col. Robert Markham Carter, Indian Medical Service
Col. Knightley Stalker Dunsterville, late Indian Ordnance Dept.
Col. Andrew Laurie Macfie, late Liverpool Reg.
Col. Patrick William Hendry, late Highland Light Inf. and Volunteer Force
Lt.-Col. Ernest William Greg, Cheshire Reg.
Lt.-Col. Walter Robert Ludlow  late Royal Warwickshire Reg.
Col. William Charles Douglas  late Royal Highlanders
Lt.-Col. George Llewellen Palmer, late Yeomanry

Australian Imperial Force
Col. Henry Gordon Bennett 
Col. Charles Henry Brand  
Col. Thomas William Glasgow  
Col. James Heane  
Col. Granville de Laune Ryrie 
Col. Alfred Sutton  Australian Army Medical Corps

Canadian Force
Col. Frederick Gault Finley, Canadian Army Medical Service
Col. Alexander McDougall, Canadian Forestry Corps
Lt.-Col. Edward Whipple Bancroft Morrison  Canadian Arty.

New Zealand Force
Col. Charles Mackie Begg  New Zealand Medical Corps

Indian Army
Lt.-Col. and Bt. Col. Herbert Campbell Holman  
Lt.-Col. and Bt. Col. William Bernard James  
Lt.-Col. and Bt. Col. Alfred William Fortescue Knox
Lt.-Col. and Bt. Col. Frederic George Lucas  Gurkhas
Maj.-Gen. Henry John Milnes MacAndrew  
Col. Francis Clifton Muspratt  
Col. Charles Gordon Prendergast
Col. Charles Wyndham Somerset 
Lt.-Col. and Bt. Col. Robert Edward Vaughan

 Civil Division 
Rear-Admiral The Hon. Edward Stafford Fitzherbert
Surg.-Gen. Arthur Edmunds 
Surg.-Gen. William Wenmoth Pryn  
Surg.-Gen. James Lawrence Smith 
Eng. Rear-Admiral William Frederick Pamphlett
Eng. Rear-Admiral Edouard Gaudin
Capt. Sir Douglas Egremont Robert Brownrigg 
Col. Commandant Charles Ernest Curtoys, Royal Marine Light Inf.
Capt. Stanley Talbot Dean-Pitt  
Capt. Frank Osborne Creagh-Osborne  
Deputy Surg.-Gen. Daniel Joseph Patrick McNabb  
Paymaster-in-Chief James Bramble  
Col. Charles Grisborne Brittan, Royal Marine Light Inf.
Eng. Capt. Robert Bland Dixon  
Frederick William Kite 
Maj. Arthur Handley, retired pay, Reserve of Ofc.s Assistant Director of Arty., War Office
Charles Henry Wellesley, Baron Nunburnholme  HM Lt. for the East Riding of Yorkshire, President, East Riding Territorial Force Association
Charles Mackinnon Douglas  Chairman, Lanarkshire Territorial Force Association
Col. Henry Whistler Smith-Rewse  Retired pay, Sec., Devonshire Territorial Force Association
Col. Richard Thompson, retired pay, Sec., Cheshire Territorial Force Association
Maj. Godfrey Richard Conyngham Stuart  Retired pay, Sec., Suffolk and Cambridgeshire Territorial Force Associations
Capt. Henry Littleton Wheeler  Retired pay, Sec., Staffordshire Territorial Force Association
John Anderson, Sec. of the National Health Insurance Commission, England, now Sec. to the Ministry of Shipping
Horace Perkins Hamilton, Private Sec. to the Chancellor of the Exchequer 
Arthur Henry Payne, Comptroller of Companies Dept., Board of Trade
Basil Alfred Kemball-Cook, Admiralty
Francis Lewis Castle Floud, Assistant Sec. to the Board of Agriculture, now acting as Director of Local Organisation Division of Food Production Dept.
Lt.-Col. Walter Edgeworth-Johnstone, Chief Comm., Dublin Metropolitan Police
Ewan Francis Macpherson, Legal Member of the Local Government Board for Scotland
Arthur Hamilton Norway, Assistant Sec. to the General Post Office
William Sanger, Assistant Sec. to The Ministry of Pensions
Maurice Lyndham Waller, Prison Comm., Head of Prisoners of War Division
Mark Manley Waller, Director of Stores, Admiralty

 The Most Exalted Order of the Star of India 

 Knight Cmdr. (KCSI) 
George Rivers Lowndes  an Ordinary Member of the Council of the Governor-General of India
His Highness Maharajadhiraja Maharawal Jawahir Singh Bahadur of Jaisalmer, Rajputana
Sir Archdale Earle  Indian Civil Service, Chief Comm. of Assam
Stuart Mitford Fraser  Indian Civil Service, Political Dept., Resident at Hyderabad
John Stratheden Campbell  Indian Civil Service, Junior Member, Board of Revenue, United Provinces of Agra and Oudh, and a Member of the Council of the Lieutenant-Governor for making Laws and Regulations
Frank George Sly  Indian Civil Service, Comm., Central ProvincesIn recognition of the services rendered by the native States of India during the War His Highness Maharaja Lakendra Govind Singh Bahadur of Datia
His Highness Maharajadhiraja Sri Sawai Maharaj Rana Udai Bhan Singh Lokindar Bahadur of Dholpur

 Companion (CSI) 
Henry Cecil Ferard  Indian Civil Service, Comm. of Allahabad, United Provinces, and a Member of the Council of the Lieutenant-Governor for making Laws and Regulations
Charles Evelyn Arbuthnot William Oldham, Indian Civil Service, Comm., Patna Division, Bihar and Orissa, and an Additional Member of the Council of the Lieutenant-Governor for making Laws and Regulations
Evan Maconochie, Indian Civil Service, Agent to the Governor, Kathiawar, Bombay Presidency
Francis Coope French, Indian Civil Service, Comm., Dacca Division, Bengal
Lt.-Col. and Bt. Col. Charles William Grant Richardson, Indian Army, Deputy Q.M.-General in India, lately Deputy Adjutant-General, Army Headquarters
Maj. Arthur Prescott Trevor  Indian Army, Deputy Political Resident, Persian Gulf
Horatio Norman Bolton  Indian Civil Service, Political Dept., Deputy Comm., Peshawar, North-West Frontier Province
Louis James Kershaw  Indian Civil Service (retired), Sec., Revenue and Statistics Dept., India Office

 The Most Distinguished Order of Saint Michael and Saint George 

 Knight Grand Cross of the Order of St Michael and St George (GCMG) 
Lt.-Gen. Sir Cecil Frederick Nevil Macready  Adjutant-General to the Forces
Lt.-Gen. Sir John Steven Cowans  Q.M.-General to the Forces
Tmp Surg.-Gen. Sir George Henry Makins  
The Hon. Sir Francis Hyde Villiers  His Majesty's Envoy Extraordinary and Minister Plenipotentiary to His Majesty the King of the Belgians

 Knight Cmdr. of the Order of St Michael and St George (KCMG) 

Vice-Admiral Frederick Charles Tudor Tudor  
Rear-Admiral Edward Francis Benedict Charlton  
Rear-Admiral Sir Osmond de Beauvoir Brock 
Rear-Admiral Richard Fortescue Phillimore 
Maj.-Gen. Charles Tyrwhitt Dawkins 
Maj.-Gen. Sir George Frederick Gorringe  late Royal Engineers
Col. Robert Whyte Melville Jackson  Army Ordnance Depot
Col. and Hon. Maj.-Gen. Harold Daniel Edmund Parsons  Army Ordnance Depot
Surg.-Gen. William Grant Macpherson  Army Medical Service
Maj.-Gen. William Henry Rycroft 
Col. and Hon. Brig.-Gen.-General Francis Sudlow Garratt  
Gen. Sir Henry Seymour Rawlinson  
Lt.-Gen. Sir Charles Fergusson  
Lt.-Gen. Sir Ronald Charles Maxwell  late Royal Engineers
Lt.-Gen. Sir Launcelot Edward Kiggell  
Lt.-Gen. Sir Henry Sinclair Horne  
Maj.-Gen. Sir Charles St. Leger Barter 
Maj.-Gen. John Adye  
Maj.-Gen. Sir Edward Ritchie Coryton Graham  Cheshire Reg.
Maj.-Gen. Sir Henry Fuller Maitland Wilson  
Maj.-Gen. Sir Richard Cyril Byrne Haking  
Maj.-Gen. Harvey Frederic Mercer  
Maj.-Gen. Frederic Manley Glubb  
Maj.-Gen. Charles James Briggs  
Maj.-Gen. Sir George Henry Fowke  
Maj.-Gen. Sir John Joseph Asser  
Maj.-Gen. Richard Harte Keatinge Butler  
Maj.-Gen. Richard Henry Ewart  
Maj.-Gen. James Frederick Noel Birch  
Maj.-Gen. John Sharman Fowler  
Tmp Maj.-Gen. Philip Arthur Manley Nash  
Col. and Hon. Surg.-Gen. James Murray Irwin  late Army Medical Service
Col. and Hon. Surg.-Gen. James Maher  late Army Medical Service
Tmp Col. James Purves Stewart  Army Medical Service
Tmp Col. Thomas Crisp English  Army Medical Service
Col. George James Butcher  Army Ordnance Depot
Hon. Maj.-Gen. Fred Smith  Royal Army Veterinary Corps
Tmp Col. Archibald Edward Garrod  Army Medical Service
Lt.-Gen. Sir Herbert Eversley Belfield  Col., West Riding Reg.
Maj.-Gen. The Hon. Cecil Edward Bingham 
Maj.-Gen. Frederick Barton Maurice  
Maj.-Gen. The Hon. Francis Richard Bingham  
Col. and Hon. Surg.-Gen. Michael William Russell  late Army Medical Service
Tmp Col. Charles Alfred Ballance  Army Medical Service
Maj.-Gen. Louis Jean Bols  For services rendered in connection with the Military Operations culminating in the capture of Jerusalem.

Australian Imperial Force
Maj.-Gen. The Hon. James Whiteside McCay  Australian Imperial Force

Colonial List
His Honour Frank Stillman Barnard, Lieutenant-Governor of the Province of British Columbia
Horace Archer Byatt  Civil Administrator, German East Africa
Maj.-Gen. Samuel Benfield Steele  Canadian Militia
Herbert James Read  Assistant Under-Sec. of State, Colonial Office
The Hon. John Mark Davies, President of the Legislative Council of the State of Victoria

Honorary Knight Cmdr
Adly Yeghen Pasha, Minister of Education in the Egyptian Government

Companion of the Order of St Michael and St George (CMG)

Capt. Henry George Glas Sandeman  
Capt. James William Combe  
Capt. George Bingham Powell  
Capt. Frederic Godfrey Bird  
Capt. David Murray Anderson 
Capt. Percy Molyneux Rawson Royds  
Capt. Charles Samuel Wills  
Capt. Charles Laverock Lambe  
Eng. Capt. Archie Russell Emdin  
Cmdr. Harold Escombe  
Cmdr. Donald John Munro 
Cmdr. Fitzmaurice Acton 
Cmdr. Ferdinand Halford Elderton  
Cmdr. Archibald Cochrane  
Fleet-Paymaster Charles Edward Allen Woolley  
Paymaster Tom Seaman  
Fleet-Paymaster Charles Henry Rowe  
Fleet-Paymaster Charles Ernest Batt  
Fleet-Surgeon Edward Henry Meaden  
Lt.-Col. Francis Doveton Bridges, Royal Marine Light Inf.
Maj. Henry Cleeve Benett, Royal Marine Light Inf.
Lt.-Cmdr. David George Hogarth, Royal Naval Volunteer Reserve
Col. Jonas Hamilton du Boulay Travers  
Col. William Arthur Murray Thompson  
Col. Cyril Henry Leigh James  
Col. St. John William Topp Parker  
Col. Charles Marling Cartwright  Indian Army
Col. Arthur Herbert Hussey  
Col. John Gordon Geddes  
Lt.-Col. and Bt.-Col. Thomas James Atherton  
Lt.-Col. and Bt. Col. Alexander Vaughan Payne, late Wiltshire Reg.
Col. Edward Ranulph Kenyon  
Col. Walter Charteris Ross  
Col. Acton Lemuel Schreiber  Royal Engineers
Col. Disney John Menzies Fasson  Royal Arty.
Col. George Strachan Cartwright  
Col. Gardiner Humphreys 
Lt.-Col. and Bt. Col. Godfrey Massy
Col. Charles Cunliffe-Owen  
Col. Arundel Martyn, General List
Col. Philip Cecil Harcourt Gordon, Army Medical Service
Col. Charles Joseph MacDonald  Army Medical Service
Col. Edward George Browne  Army Medical Service
Col. Samuel Guise Moores  Army Medical Service
Lt.-Col. and Bt. Col. Howard Ensor  RAMC
Col. Colin Lawrence Macnab
Lt.-Col. and Bt. Col. Charles Stuart Wilson  Royal Engineers
Lt.-Col. and Bt. Col. Herbert Edward John Brake  Royal Arty.
Col. Martin Newman Turner  
Maj. and Bt. Col. Clement Yatman  Northumberland Fusiliers
Lt.-Col. and Bt. Col. Pomeroy Holland-Pryor  Indian Army
Lt.-Col. and Bt. Col. Sydney Fortescue Metcalfe  Royal Arty.
Lt.-Col. and Bt. Col. Geoffrey Herbert Anthony White  Royal Arty.
Lt.-Col. and Bt. Col. Arthur Wharton Peck, Indian Cav.
Maj. and Bt. Lt.-Col. Walter Mervyn St. George Kirke  Royal Arty.
Tmp Col. William Pasteur  Army Medical Service
Maj. and Bt. Col. Gerald Farrell Boyd  Royal Irish Reg.
Lt.-Col. and Bt. Col. Thomas Stanton Lambert, East Lancashire Reg.
Lt.-Col. and Bt. Col. John Samuel Jocelyn Percy  East Lancashire Reg.
Maj. and Bt. Col. Percival Otway Hambro, Hussars
Lt.-Col. Charles Tilson Hudson, Indian Medical Service
Lt.-Col. William Bromley-Davenport  Reserve
Lt.-Col. Philip John Joseph Radcliffe, Royal Engineers
Lt.-Col. Maurice Spencer, Army Ordnance Depot
Lt.-Col. George Ambrose Cardew  Royal Field Arty.
Lt.-Col. Ernest Carden Freeth Gillespie  Army Service Corps
Lt.-Col. Daniel Davis Shanahan  RAMC
Lt.-Col. Walter Ernest Onslow Campbell Blunt, Army Pay Dept.
Lt.-Col. Henry Jenkins Brock  Royal Arty.
Lt.-Col. Edward John Russell Peel  Royal Field Arty.
Lt.-Col. Cecil William Davy, Royal Engineers
Lt.-Col. George Augustus Stewart Cape, Royal Field Arty.
Lt.-Col. Arthur Cecil Lowe  Royal Field Arty.
Lt.-Col. Ulric Oliver Thynne  Yeomanry
Lt.-Col. and Hon. Col. William Dutton Burrard, Royal Field Arty.
Tmp Lt.-Col. Edward Henry Charles Patrick Bellingham  General List
Col. Ernest William Bliss  Army Medical Service
Col. Alfred Ernest Conquer Keble  Army Medical Service
Tmp Honorary Lt.-Col. Nathan Raw  RAMC
Tmp Lt.-Col. Cecil Walter Paget  Royal Engineers
Lt.-Col. Philip Leveson Gower  Nottinghamshire and Derbyshire Reg.
Lt.-Col. James Anderson  Highland Light Inf.
Hon. Lt.-Col. Percy George Davies, Army Ordnance Depot
Lt.-Col. Edward William Saurin Brooke  Royal Arty.
Capt. and Bt. Lt.-Col. Ernest Frederick Orby Gascoigne  Grenadier Guards
Maj. and Bt. Lt.-Col. Thomas Herbert Francis Price  Duke of Cornwall's Light Inf.
Lt.-Col. George Birnie Mackenzie  Royal Garrison Arty.
Lt.-Col. Charles Frederick Moores  Army Service Corps
Col. Charles William Profeit  Army Medical Service
Col. Robert James Blackham  Army Medical Service
Lt.-Col. Horace Giesler Lloyd  Royal Arty.
Lt.-Col. Percy Cyriac Burrell Skinner  Northamptonshire Reg.
Lt.-Col. William Charles Eric Rudkin  Royal Field Arty.
Lt.-Col. Bertram Hewett Hunter Cooke  Rifle Brigade
Maj. and Bt. Lt.-Col. Edward Nicholson Broadbent  King's Own Scottish Borderers
Maj. and Bt. Lt.-Col. Arthur Richard Careless Sanders  Royal Engineers
Lt.-Col. Robert Gabbett Parker  Royal Lancaster Reg.
Lt.-Col. Arthur Thackeray Beckwith  Hampshire Reg.
Lt.-Col. Edward Harding Newman  Royal Field Arty.
Lt.-Col. Francis Arthur Wynter  Royal Garrison Arty.
Lt.-Col. John Francis Innes Hay Doyle  Royal Arty.
Tmp Lt.-Col. Cyril Aubrey Blacklock  General List
Lt.-Col. Edward Evans  Wiltshire Reg.
Lt.-Col. Francis Douglas Logan  Royal Arty.
Maj. and Bt. Lt.-Col. George Ayscough Armytage  King's Royal Rifle Corps
Maj. and Bt. Lt.-Col. John Vaughan Campbell  Coldstream Guards
Maj. and Bt. Lt.-Col. William Harry Verelst Darell  Coldstream Guards
Maj. and Bt. Lt.-Col. Stuart William Hughes Rawlins  Royal Field Arty.
Maj. and Bt. Lt.-Col. Charles Michael Browne  Royal Engineers
Maj. and Bt. Lt.-Col. Llewelyn Alberic Emilius Price-Davies  King's Royal Rifle Corps
Maj. and Bt. Lt.-Col. Herbert Cecil Potter  Liverpool Reg.
Lt.-Col. Edward Arthur Fagan  Indian Army
Tmp Lt. Col. John Anselm Samuel Gray  Special List
Lt.-Col. Manners Ralph Wilmott Nightingale  Indian Army
Tmp Lt.-Col. Geoffrey Harnett Harrisson  Royal Engineers
Lt.-Col. Walter Bagot Pearson, Lancashire Fusiliers
Tmp Lt.-Col. Frank Percy Crozier  General List
Lt.-Col. Charles William Wilkinson  Royal Engineers
Lt.-Col. Arthur Ellershaw  Royal Garrison Arty.
Lt.-Col. Charles Richard Newman  Royal Arty.
Maj. and Bt. Lt.-Col. Reginald Seaburne May  Royal Fusiliers
Maj. and Bt. Lt.-Col. Guy Hamilton Boileau  Royal Engineers
Maj. and Bt. Lt.-Col. Edmund William Costello  Indian Army
Maj. and Bt. Lt.-Col. Robert Harvey Kearsley  Dragoon Guards
Maj. and Bt. Lt.-Col. Edward Lacy Challenor  Leicestershire Reg.
Maj. and Bt. Lt.-Col. Francis James Marshall  Seaforth Highlanders
Maj. and Bt. Lt.-Col. Frank Graham Marsh, Indian Army
Maj. and Bt. Lt.-Col. Sir William Algernon Ireland Kay  King's Royal Rifle Corps
Maj. and Bt. Lt.-Col. Frederick William Lawrence Sheppard Hart Cavendish  Lancers
Maj. and Bt. Lt.-Col. Thomas Wolryche Stansfeld  Yorkshire Reg.
Maj. and Bt. Lt.-Col. John Edward Spencer Brind  Royal Arty.
Maj. and Bt. Lt.-Col. George Henry Addison  Royal Engineers
Maj. and Bt. Lt.-Col. William Edmund Ironside  Royal Arty.
Maj. and Bt. Lt.-Col. Robert Gordon-Finlayson  Royal Arty.
Maj. and Bt. Lt.-Col. Alan Thomas Paley  Rifle Brigade
Maj. and Bt. Lt.-Col. James Keith Dick-Cunyngham  Gordon Highlanders
Maj. and Bt. Lt.-Col. Francis Stewart Montague-Bates  East Surrey Reg.
Capt. and Bt. Lt.-Col. Guy Payan Dawnay  late Coldstream Guards
Tmp Lt.-Col. Ernest Henry Starling  RAMC
Tmp Lt.-Col. Leonard Stanley Dudgeon  RAMC
Lt.-Col. Francis William Gosset  Royal Arty.
Lt.-Col. John Hamilton Hall  Middlesex Reg.
Lt.-Col. Herbert Norwood Blakeney  Middlesex Reg.
Maj. and Bt. Lt.-Col. Arthur Jervois Turner  Royal Arty.
Maj. and Bt. Lt.-Col. Henry Clifford Rodes Green  King's Royal Rifle Corps
Maj. and Bt. Lt.-Col. George Dominic Price, West Yorkshire Reg.
Maj. and Bt. Lt.-Col. Charles George Lewes  Essex Reg.
Maj. and Bt. Lt.-Col. Gerald Edward Bayley  York & Lancaster Reg.
Lt.-Col. William Kaye Legge  Essex Reg.
Maj. and Bt. Lt.-Col. Robert Emile Shepherd Prentice  Highland Light Inf.
Maj. and Bt. Lt.-Col. Sir Hereward Wake  King's Royal Rifle Corps
Maj. and Bt. Lt.-Col. Rodolph Ladeveze Adlercron  Cameron Highlanders
Maj. and Bt. Lt.-Col. Charles Howard Foulkes  Royal Engineers
Maj. and Bt. Lt.-Col. Edward Weyland Martin Powell  Royal Field Arty.
Lt.-Col. Clennell William Collingwood  Royal Garrison Arty.
Maj. and Bt. Lt.-Col. Percival Suther  Royal Garrison Arty.
Maj. and Bt. Lt.-Col. Harold St. John Loyd Winterbotham  Royal Engineers
Maj. and Bt. Lt.-Col. Arthur Wollaston Bartholomew  Royal Arty.
Maj. and Bt. Lt.-Col. Cecil Percival Heywood  Coldstream Guards
Maj. and Bt. Lt.-Col. Harry Beauchamp Douglas Baird  Indian Army
Maj. and Bt. Lt.-Col. Tom Ince Webb-Bowen, Bedfordshire Reg.
Maj. and Bt. Lt.-Col. Hugh Roger Headlam  York & Lancaster Reg.
Maj. and Bt. Lt.-Col. Norman William Webber  Royal Engineers
Maj. and Bt. Lt.-Col. Walter William Pitt-Taylor  Rifle Brigade
Maj. and Bt. Lt.-Col. Robert John Collins  Royal Berkshire Reg.
Maj. and Bt. Lt.-Col. Charles Ogston  Gordon Highlanders
Maj. and Bt. Lt.-Col. Gervase Thorpe  Argyll and Sutherland Highlanders
Maj. and Bt. Lt.-Col. Winston Joseph Dugan  Worcestershire Reg.
Maj. and Bt. Lt.-Col. Lewis James Comyn  Connaught Rangers
Maj. and Bt. Lt.-Col. Charles Samuel Owen  Royal Welsh Fusiliers
Maj. and Bt. Lt.-Col. Clifton Inglis Stockwell  Royal Welsh Fusiliers
Maj. and Bt. Lt.-Col. Charles Harry Lyon  North Staffordshire Reg.
Maj. and Bt. Lt.-Col. Arthur Hardwicke Spooner  Lancashire Fusiliers
Maj. and Bt. Lt.-Col. Henry Pelham Burn  Gordon Highlanders
Maj. and Bt. Lt.-Col. John Greer Dill  Leinster Reg.
Maj. and Bt. Lt.-Col. Henry Courtenay Hawtrey  Royal Engineers
Tmp Lt.-Col. Brodie Haldane Henderson, Royal Engineers
Tmp Lt.-Col. Edward Hyde Hamilton Gordon  General List
Lt.-Col. Arthur Clement Wilkinson  Royal Garrison Arty.
Maj. and Bt. Lt.-Col. Herbert Edward Trevor  Yorkshire Light Inf.
Maj. Francis Jenkins, Coldstream Guards
Maj. Percy Gerald Parker Lea  Army Service Corps
Maj. Henry Warburton Hill  Royal Field Arty.
Maj. Roger Gordon Thomson  Royal Field Arty.
Maj. and Bt. Lt.-Col. Gerald Carew Sladen  Rifle Brigade
Tmp Lt.-Col. Christopher D'Arcy Bloomfield Saltern Baker-Carr  Tank Corps
Maj. John Edmund Hugh Balfour  late Hussars
Maj. Alexander James King  late Royal Lancaster Reg.
Tmp Major George Simpson Pitcairn, Royal Engineers
Maj. Vaughan Randolph Hine-Haycock  late Royal Arty.
Capt. and Bt. Major Rudolph Edmund Aloysius, Viscount Feilding  Coldstream Guards
Capt. and Bt. Major Cyril Edward Wilson  late East Lancashire Reg.
Capt. Bryan Charles Fairfax, New Armies
Col. The Rt. Hon. John Edward Bernard Seely  Yeomanry
Lt.-Col. Arthur Saxby Barham, London Reg.
Lt.-Col. William Elliott Batt, Royal Field Arty.
Lt.-Col. Frederick William Duffield Bendall, Middlesex Reg.
Lt.-Col. Lionel Leonard Bilton, Worcestershire Reg.
Lt.-Col. Hugh Delabere Bousfield  West Yorkshire Reg.
Lt.-Col. Robert Chapman  Royal Field Arty.
Lt.-Col. Robert Joyce Clarke  Royal Berkshire Reg.
Lt.-Col. Charles Clifford, Royal Field Arty.
Lt.-Col. Hugh Charles Copeman  Suffolk Reg. (late Essex Reg.)
Lt.-Col. Clarence Isidore Ellis, RAMC
Lt.-Col. Archibald Stewart Leslie, Yeomanry
Lt.-Col. Frederick William Schofield, Oxfordshire & Buckinghamshire Light Inf.
Lt.-Col. John William Slater, Liverpool Reg.
Lt.-Col. Francis Henry Douglas Charlton Whitmore  Yeomanry
Maj.-Gen. Raymond Northland Revell Reade  
Col. William Pitt
Col. Thomas Ryder Main  
Col. Arthur Henry Bagnold  
Col. William Hodgson Suart
Col. Henry Richard Beadon Donne  
Lt.-Col. and Bt. Col. Alfred Keene  late Royal Arty.
Lt.-Col. and Bt. Col. William Augustus Edmund St. Clair, late Royal Engineers
Col. Frederick Rainsford-Hannay  
Col. Charles Henry Darling
Lt.-Col. and Bt. Col. Percy Rice Mockler, late Royal Warwickshire Reg.
Hon. Col. Sir Herbert Merton Jessel  London Reg. and Remount Service
Col. and Hon. Brig.-Gen.-General Hugh James Archdale  
Maj. and Bt. Col. Edward Bell, late Worcestershire Reg.
Lt. Joseph Griffiths  RAMC
Col. Charles Edwin Nuthall  
Col. Guy William Fitton, Army Pay Dept.
Col. George Francis Milner 
Col. Arnaud Clarke Painter
Col. and Hon. Brig.-Gen.-General Frank Grimshaw Lagier Lamotte
Col. Louis Peile Carden
Col. Arthur Ludovic Molesworth
Col. Charles Pye Oliver  RAMC
Col. and Hon. Brig.-Gen.-General Philip Thomas Buston  
Col. Edward Bickford
Col. Ernest Augustus Tudor Tudor
Col. Frederick Charlton Meyrick  Late Major, Hussars
Col. Harold Stephen Langhorne  Army Ordnance Depot
Lt.-Col. and Bt. Col. Wilkinson Dent Bird 
Col. Charles Henderson Melville  Army Medical Service
Col. Malcolm David Graham  Assistant Military Sec., War Office
Tmp Honorary Col. Sir John Collie  Army Medical Service
Lt.-Col. John George Adamson, late King's Own Yorkshire Light Inf.
Lt.-Col. John Arthur Coghill Somerville, late Royal Sussex Reg.
Lt.-Col. Arthur de Courcy Scanlan, RAMC
Lt.-Col. William Denziloe Sanderson  North Lancashire Reg.
Tmp Honorary Lt.-Col. Harry Richard Kenwood  RAMC
Tmp Honorary Lt.-Col. John Robertson  RAMC
Lt.-Col. John Ward  Middlesex Reg.
Tmp Lt.-Col. John Charles Grant Ledingham  RAMC
Lt.-Col. and Hon. Col. Alfred Briffa, King's Own Malta Reg. of Militia
Maj. Frederick Knight Essell, late East Kent Reg.
Maj. Henry Charles Bulkeley 
Tmp Lt.-Col. Charles Morley Wenyon  RAMC
Maj. and Bt. Lt.-Col. Henry Andrew Micklem  Retired pay
Maj. and Bt. Lt.-Col. Charles Monk Gibbon, Royal Irish Fusiliers
Maj. and Bt. Lt.-Col. Robert May Wetherell, Duke of Cornwall's Light Inf.
Lt.-Col. Henry Godfrey Howorth, Royal Arty.
Tmp Lt.-Col. Arthur Treharne Andrews, Royal Engineers
Tmp Lt.-Col. George Basil Price  RAMC
Maj. and Bt. Lt.-Col. Duncan le Geyt Pitcher, Indian Army
Lt.-Col. Stanley Clarence Halse, Royal Garrison Arty.
Maj. and Bt. Lt.-Col. William Dundas Dooner, Army Ordnance Depot
Maj. and Bt. Lt.-Col. Frederick Walter Radcliffe  Dorsetshire Reg.
Lt.-Col. Arthur John Bromley Church, Army Pay Dept.
Lt.-Col. Hamlet Bush Toller, Army Pay Dept.
Lt.-Col. Cecil de Sausmarez  Royal Garrison Arty.
Lt.-Col. Henry Stewart Anderson, RAMC
Lt.-Col. William Parry, Army Pay Dept.
Tmp Lt.-Col. Sir William Henry Houghton-Gastrell  Army Service Corps
Lt.-Col. William Egerton Edwards, Royal Arty.
Maj. and Bt. Lt.-Col. Kenneth Marten Body, Army Ordnance Depot
Lt.-Col. Frederick Lindsay Lloyd
Hon. Lt.-Col. Alfred James Foster, Northumberland Fusiliers, late Royal Garrison Arty., Militia
Lt.-Col. Charles Richard Blackstone Owen, Royal Arty.
Maj. and Bt. Lt.-Col. Lewis Frederick Renny  Royal Dublin Fusiliers
Tmp Lt. Robert Henry More, late Imperial Yeomanry, Assistant Military Sec., War Office
Maj. Charles Edward Norton, late Royal Engineers
Maj. the Honorauble Alexander Victor Frederick Villiers Russell  Grenadier Guards
Maj. Lionel George Tempest Stone, Royal Fusiliers
Maj. John Sedley Newton de Joux, South Staffordshire Reg.
Maj. Francis Vernon Willey, Yeomanry
Maj. James George Weir, Royal Field Arty.
Tmp Major Arthur John Allen-Williams  Royal Engineers
Capt. Cecil Henry Whittington, Royal Flying Corps
Lt.-Col. and Hon. Col. Hugh Henry John Williams Drummond, late Yeomanry
Lt.-Col. and Hon. Col. Lionel Richard Cavendish Boyle  late Honourable Arty. Company
Lt.-Col. Stanley Hatch Page, Royal Field Arty.
Maj. Osmond Robert McMullen, Royal Garrison Arty.
Lt.-Col. John Fred Keen, Royal Engineers
Maj. Thomas Wardrop Griffith  RAMC
Lt.-Col. William Mitchell Roocroft, RAMC

Australian Imperial Force
Maj.-Gen. Cyril Brudenell Bingham White 
Col. George Walter Barber  Medical Corps
Col. Thomas Albert Blamey  Inf.
Col. Charles Frederick Cox  Commonwealth Military Forces
Col. Walter Adams Coxen  Commonwealth Military Forces
Col. Robert Rupert Major Downes, Medical Corps
Col. Walter Ramsay McNicoll  Inf.
Col. Robert Smith  Inf.
Lt.-Col. Harold Edward Cohen  Field Arty.
Lt.-Col. Ernest Arthur Kendall, Royal Army Veterinary Corps
Lt.-Col. Raymond Lionel Leane  Inf.
Lt.-Col. Edward Fowell Martin  Inf.
Lt.-Col. Athelstan Markham Martyn  Engineers
Lt.-Col. Charles Gordon Norman Miles  Field Arty.
Lt.-Col. Alexander Windeyer Ralston  Inf.
Lt.-Col. William Henry Scott  Light Horse Reg.
Lt.-Col. George Cattell Somerville 
Lt.-Col. Walter Howard Tunbridge  Army Service Corps
Lt.-Col. Arthur Thomas White, Army Medical Corps
Lt.-Col. Cyril Tracy Griffiths
Senior Chaplain James Green
Lt.-Col. John Gordon, Army Medical Corps
Tmp Lt.-Col. Lionel James Hurley, attd. Australian Imperial Force
Lt.-Col. George Hodges Knox
Lt.-Col. Douglas Murray McWhae, Army Medical Corps
Hon. Lt.-Col. James Anderson Murdoch, Army Medical Corps
Lt.-Col. Kenneth Smith, Army Medical Corps

Canadian Force
Lt.-Col. Hugh Marshall Dyer  Inf.
Lt.-Col. William Antrobus Griesbach  Inf.
Lt.-Col. Frederic William Hill  Inf.
Maj. and Bt. Lt.-Col. James Howden MacBrien  Dragoons
Lt.-Col. Charles Henry MacLaren  Arty.
Maj. Howard Lionel Bodwell  Pioneers
Maj. Édouard de Bellefeuille Panet  Arty.
Col. John Alexander Armstrong
Col. Ernest Charles Ashton
Col. Kenneth Cameron, Army Medical Corps
Col. George Septimus Rennie, Army Medical Corps
Col. Wallace Arthur Scott, Army Medical Corps
Col. Walter Langmuir Watt, Army Medical Corps
Lt.-Col. James Louis Regan, Royal Army Pay Corps
Maj. John Andrew Amyot, Army Medical Corps
Maj. Bernard Rickert Hepburn, Forestry Corps
Tmp Honorary Major George Anderson Wells, Chaplain Services

New Zealand Force
Lt.-Col. Norris Stephen Falla  New Zealand Field Arty.
Lt.-Col. George Thompson Hall, Army Service Corps
Maj. Thomas Henry Dawson, Inf.
Maj. Thomas Mill  Medical Corps
Maj. Norton Francis, Motor Service Corps

South African Force
Col. Stanley Archibald Markham Pritchard, Native Labour Corps

Colonial List
Philip Arnold Anthony, General Manager of the Federated Malay States Railways
Algernon Edward Aspinall, Sec., The West India Committee
Lt.-Col. Louis Edward Barnett, New Zealand Medical Corps
Harry Fagg Batterbee, of the Colonial Office, Private Sec. to the Sec. of State for the Colonies
Rodolphe Boudreau, Clerk of the Privy Council for Canada
Peter Joseph McDermott  Under-Sec., Chief Sec.'s Dept., State of Queensland
Arthur Mews, Deputy Colonial Sec., Newfoundland
The Hon. William Bispham Propsting, Attorney-General and Minister for Railways of the State of Tasmania
Theodorus Gustaff Truter, Comm. of Police, Union of South Africa
Robert Walter, Colonial Sec. of the Colony of British Honduras
Jeremiah Wilson, Postmaster-General, Union of South Africa

Diplomatic and Overseas Residents
John Charles Tudor Vaughan  Counsellor at His Majesty's Embassy at Madrid
James William Ronald Macleay, Counsellor of Embassy in His Majesty's Diplomatic Service
Dayrell Eardley Montague Crackanthorpe, Counsellor to His Majesty's Legation at Athens
Edward Henry John Leslie, of the Foreign Office 
Hugh Gurney  First Sec. to His Majesty's Legation at Copenhagen
Guy Harold Locock, of the Foreign Office, attached to the Dept. of Commercial Intelligence

Honorary Companions
His Highness Daudi Chwa, Kabaka of Buganda
Louis Antonio Andrade, District Comm. for the Island of Zanzibar

 The Most Eminent Order of the Indian Empire 

 Knight Grand Cmdr. (GCIE) 

His Highness Maharajadhiraja Sawai Tukoji Rao Holkar Bahadur, of Indore, in recognition of the Services rendered by the Native States of India during the War

 Knight Cmdr. (KCIE) 
John Barry Wood  Indian Civil Service, Political Sec. to the Government of India in the Foreign and Political Dept., and an Additional Membei of the Council of the Governor-General for making Laws and Regulations
Bertram Sausmarez Carey  Burma Commission, Comm., Sagaing, Burma, and a Member of the Council of the Lieutenant-Governor for making Laws and Regulations
Alfred Hamilton Grant  Indian Civil Service, Foreign Sec. to the Government of India in the Foreign and Political Dept., and an Additional Member of the Council of the Governor-General for making Laws and Regulations
His Highness Raja Bir Indra Singh, of Rajgarh. 
His Highness Raja Sir Bhure Singh  of Chamba 
His Highness Raja Bhim Sen, of Suket
Capt. His Highness Rana Ranjit Singh, of Barwani Majaraja 
Bir Mitradaya Singh Deo, of Sonpur Raja Han Singh, Cmdr.-in-Chief of the Kashmir Army

Honorary Knight Cmdr
 Abdul Karim Fadthli bin Ah, Sultan of Al Hauta (Lahej)

Companion (CIE)

Arthur Herbert Ley, Indian Civil Service, Officiating Sec., Commerce and Industry Dept., Government of India
Peter Henry Clutterbuck  Indian Forest Service, Chief Conservator of Forests, United Provinces, and a Member of the Council of the Lieutenant-Governor for making Laws and Regulations
James Donald, Indian Civil Service, Sec. to Government of Bengal, Financial Dept., and an Additional Member of the Council of the Governor for making Laws and Regulations
William Woodward Hornell, Indian Educational Service, Director of Public Instruction, Bengal, and an Additional Member of the Council of the Governor for making Laws and Regulations
Harchandrai Vishandas, Pleader, Karachi, President of the Municipal Corporation and an Additional Member of the Council of the Governor of Bombay for making Laws and Regulations
Thomas Ryan, Finance Accounts Dept., Sec. to the Indian Munitions Board
Arthur William Botham, Indian Civil Service, Second Sec. to the Chief Comm., Assam, and a Member of the Council of the Chief Comm. for making Laws and Regulations
Lt.-Col. and Bt. Col. Henry Francis Cleveland,  Indian Medical Service, Deputy Director-General, Indian Medical Service
Augustus Henry Deane  His Majesty's Consul for Pondicherry and Karikal
Lt.-Col. Bawa Jiwan Singh, Indian Medical Service, Inspector-General of Prisons, Bihar and Orissa, and an Additional Member of the Councilof the Lieutenant-Governor for making Laws and Regulations
Lt.-Col. William Byan Lane, Indian Medical Service, Inspector-General of Prisons, Central Provinces
Harry Nelson Heseltine, Civil Accounts Dept., Accountant-General for Railways, India
Alexander Langley, Indian Civil Service, Deputy Comm. of Hoshiarpur, Punjab
Lt.-Col. Henry Smith  Indian Medical Service, Civil Surgeon, Amritsar, Punjab
Lt.-Col. Francis William Hallowes, Supply and Transport Corps, Director of Farms, India
Maj. Henry Coddington Brown, Indian Medical Service, Assistant Director, Central Research Institute, Kasauli
Robert Colquhoun Boyle, Indian Police, Commandant, Frontier Constabulary, North-West Frontier Province
Lewis Wynne Hartley, Income-Tax Comm., Bombay
Raja Sayyid Abu Jafar, Taluqdar of Pirpur, in the Fyzabad District of Oudh, United Provinces
Rai Bahadur Pandit Gopinath, Member of Council, Jaipur State, Rajputana
Jhala Sri Mansinghji Suraj Sinhji, Dewan of Dhrangadhra, Kathiawar, Bombay Presidency
Khan Bahadur Khan Ahmad Shah, Honorary Sub-Judge and Hon. Magistrate, Jullundur, Punjab
Assistant Surgeon Kedar Nath Das  Professor of Midwifery, Campbell Medical School, Calcutta
Brig.-Gen.-General John Latham Rose, Indian Army, Officiating Inspector-General, Imperial Service Troops
Lt.-Col. Roger Lloyd Kennion, Indian Army, Political Dept., Consul at Kermanshah
Lt.-Col. Hugh Augustus Keppel Gough, Indian Army, Political Dept., Consul at Shiraz, Persian Gulf
Temporary Major John Arnold Wallinger  Indian, Police
Capt. Edward William Charles Noel, Indian Army, His Britannic Majesty's Vice-Consul, Ahwaz, and Assistant to Political Resident in Persian Gulf
His Highness Maharaja Tashi Naingyal, of Sikkim Sao Kawn Kiao Intaleng, Sawbwa of Kengtung

 Imperial Order of the Crown of India
Her Highness Maji Sahiba Girraj Kaur, of Bharatpur

 The Royal Victorian Order 

 Knight Grand Cross of the Royal Victorian Order (GCVO) 
His Highness Maharaja Maharana Sir Fateh Singh Bahadur, of Udaipur 
The Rt. Hon. James, Viscount Bryce 
Sir Bertrand Edward Dawson  (dated 22 December 1917)

 Knight Cmdr. of the Royal Victorian Order (KCVO) 
Sir Charles Edward Troup  
Lt.-Col. Hugh Mallinson Rigby  RAMC (dated 22 December 1917)

 Cmdr. of the Royal Victorian Order (CVO) 
Sidney West Harris  
Matthew Walter Gibson  
John Leonard Bolden

 Member of the Royal Victorian Order, 4th class (MVO) 
Lt.-Col. Wyndham Raymond Portal  (dated 20 December 1917)
Staff Surgeon Louis Greis, Royal Navy (dated 22 December 1917)
Lt.-Col. John Cyril Giffard Alers Hankey
Capt. Augustus Frederick Liddell, late Royal Arty.

The Most Excellent Order of the British Empire

 Dame Grand Cross of the Order of the British Empire (GBE) 

 Civil Division 
Her Majesty, Queen Alexandra
Margaret, Baroness Ampthill  President of the Bedfordshire Branch of the British Red Cross Society; Member of Council, British Red Cross Society; Head of the Voluntary Aid Detachment Dept., Devonshire House
Edith Isabel Benyon, President of the Berkshire Branch of the British Red Cross Society; Commandant of Englefield House Hospital, near Reading
Aimee Evelyn, Lady Dawson, Joint Honorary Sec., Queen Mary's Needlework Guild
Violet Hermione, Duchess of Montrose, President of the Scottish Branch of the British Red Cross Society
Mary Elizabeth, Viscountess Northcliffe, Member of the Joint Committee of the British Red Cross-Society and Order of St. John of Jerusalem; Donor and Administrator of Lady Northcliffe's Hospital for Ofc.s

Dominion of New Zealand
Her Excellency Annette Louise, Countess of Liverpool

British India
Her Highness Nawab Sultan Jahan Begum  of Bhopal, in recognition of Services rendered by the Native States of India during the War.

 Knight Grand Cross of the Order of the British Empire (GBE) 

 Civil Division 
Sir Thomas Dunlop  Lord Provost of Glasgow
William Henry Ellis, Master Cutler of Sheffield
Sir Richard Charles Garton, Founder of the Garton Foundation for Promoting the Study of International Policy and Economics; Honorary Treasurer of the Trust Fund Committee of Queen Mary's Hostel
The Rt. Hon. Sir David Harrel  Chairman of the Committee on Production
Sir Robert Arundell Hudson, Treasurer and Financial Director of the Joint Committee of the British Red Cross Society and the Order of St. John of Jerusalem in England
Col. Sir Arthur Hamilton Lee  Director-General of Food Production
Sir William Plender

Egypt and the Sudan
Gen. Sir Francis Reginald Wingate  His Majesty's High Comm. for Egypt

British IndiaIn recognition of Services rendered by the Native States of India during the War —Lt.-Gen. His Highness Maharajadhiraja Sir Pratap Singh Bahadur  of Jammu and Kashmir
Maj.-Gen. His Highness Maharajadhiraja Sir Sawai Madho Singh Bahadur  of Jaipur 
Lt.-Col. His Highness Maharao Sir Umed Singh Bahadur  of Kotah
Lt.-Col. His Highness Maharahadhiraja Sri Sir Bhupindar Singh Mahindar Bahadur  of Patiala

 Dame Cmdr. of the Order of the British Empire (DBE) 

 Civil Division 
The Hon. Eva Isabella Henrietta Anstruther, Organiser of Soldiers Libraries
Caroline, Lady Arnott, Vice-President, Soldiers and Sailors Help Society, Dublin
Maud Burnett, Town Councillor of Tynemouth
Alice Mary Godman
Agnes Lowndes, Lady Jekyll, Head of Stores Dept., Order of St. John of Jerusalem
Adelaide Livingstone, Sec. of the Government Committee on the Treatment by the Enemy of British Prisoners of War
Ethel Locke King, Vice-President of North Surrey Division and Assistant County Director, Surrey, British Red Cross and Order of St. John of Jerusalem
Flora, Lady Lugard, Joint Founder of the War Refugees Committee, and Founder of the Lady Lugard Hospitality Committee
Margaret Ker Pryse-Rice, President, Carmarthenshire Branch of the British Red Cross Society
Rosamond Cornelia Gwladys, Viscountess Ridley, Donor and Administrator, Lady Ridley's Hospital for Ofcs
Edith Harriet, Lady Sclater, President of Lady Sclater's Work Room and Smokes Fund
Olive Crofton, Lady Smith-Dorrien, President of the Hospital Bag Fund
Janet Stancomb-Wills
May Webster, Chairman of the British Women's Hospitals Committee; Chairman of the Three Arts Women's Employment Fund

Commonwealth of Australia
Madame Melba, for services in organising patriotic work

Newfoundland
Margaret Agnes, Lady Davidson, for services in connection with the Women's Patriotic Association

 Knight Cmdr. of the Order of the British Empire (KBE)

 Military Division 
Army
Col. James Galloway  Army Medical Service, Chief Comm. for Medical Services, Ministry of National Service
Brig.-Gen.-General Louis Charles Jackson  Late Controller of the Trench Warfare Research Dept., Ministry of Munitions
Col. John Seymour Lloyd  Director General of Recruiting, Royal Army Service Corps

 Civil Division 

Francis Arthur Aglen, Inspector-General of the Chinese Maritime Customs
Frank Baillie, Director of National Aeroplane Factory, Toronto
Clement Anderson Montague-Barlow 
John Field Beale, Vice-Chairman, Royal Commission on Wheat Supplies; Chairman of Allied Wheat Executive
Col. Sir George Thomas Beatson  Chairman, Scottish Branch, British Red Cross Society
Walter Becker
Andrew Caird, Administrator, New York Headquarters of the British War Mission to the United States of America
James Cantlie  Member of Council and of Executive Committee, British Red Cross Society
Col. Charles Frederick Close  Director-General of the Ordnance Survey of the United Kingdom
Alfred Thomas Davies  Founder and Hon. Director of the British Prisoners of War Book Scheme
Joseph Davies, Representative for Wales and Monmouthshire of the Cabinet Committee for Prevention of Unemployment and Distress
William Henry Davison
Alfred Hull Dennis  Assistant Treasury Solicitor
The Rt. Hon. Willoughby Hyett Dickinson  Chairman of the Soldiers Dependants' Assessment Appeals Committee
William Don, Lord Provost of Dundee
Arthur John Dorman, Chairman of Messrs. Dorman, Long and Co., of Middlesbrough
Bignell George Elliott
Herbert Trustram Eve, Chairman of the Forage Committee
Walter Morley Fletcher  Sec. of the Medical Research Committee
Sir William Bower Forwood
Lt.-Col. Henry Fowler  Chief Mechanical Engineer to the Midland Railway; Superintendent of the Royal Aircraft Factory, Farnborough
Col. Alexander Gibb, Royal Engineers, of the firm of Messrs. Easton, Gibb and Son
Kenneth Weldon Goadby  Member of the War Office Committee for the Study of Tetanus
Arthur Home Goldfinch, Director of Raw Materials, Dept. of the Surveyor-General of Supply, War Office
William Athelstane Meredith Goode, Honorary Sec. of the National Committee for Relief in Belgium
Alexander Gracie  Managing Director of the Fairfield Shipbuilding and Engineering Company, Ltd.
Sir William Grey-Wilson  Chairman of the Central Committee for Patriotic Organisations
Connop Guthrie, Representative of the Director of Transports in the United States of America
Lt.-Col. Frederick Hall 
Arthur Ambrose Hall Harris, Acting Director of Overseas Transport to the Canadian Government; Representative of the Director of Transports in Canada
Frederick Ness Henderson, Member of the Admiralty Shipbuilding Council
Philip Gutterez Henriques, Deputy Controller of Munitions Finance
Ernest Varvill Hiley, Late Deputy Director of the National Service Dept.
Col. Arthur Richard Holbrook 
Lt.-Col. Robert Stevenson Horne  Royal Engineers, Director of Materials and Priority, Controller's Dept., Admiralty
George Burton Hunter  Chairman of Messrs. Swan, Hunter & Wigham Richardson & Company, Ltd., Newcastle upon Tyne
Gustave Jarmay, Managing Director of Messrs. Brunner, Mond & Co., Ltd.
Edgar Rees Jones  Superintendent, Priority Dept., Ministry of Munitions
Roderick Jones, Managing Director, Reuter's Telegram Company, Ltd.
Charles Halestaff Kenderdine, Honorary Sec. and Treasurer, Queen Mary's Convalescent Auxiliary Hospitals, Roehampton
Harry Livesey, Director of Navy Contracts, Admiralty; formerly Deputy Director of Inland Water Transport and Docks, War Office
John Mann, Controller of Contracts, Ministry of Munitions
Arthur Harold Marshall  Chairman of the Central Building Board, of the Parliamentary Munitions Committee, and of the Parliamentary Recruiting Committee
George Ernest May, Sec. to the Prudential Assurance Company; Manager of the American Dollar Securities Committee
Peter Hannay McClelland, Member of Advisory Board, Surveyor General of Supply Dept., War Office
James McKechnie, Managing Director of Messrs. Vickers, Ltd., Barrow
Col. Andrew Muter John Ogilvie  Royal Engineers, Director of Army Signals (Home Defence); Second Sec. to the Post Office
Thomas Henry Penson, Chairman of the War Trade Intelligence Dept.
Edward Penton, Junior, in charge of Boot Section, Royal Army Clothing Dept.
Frederick George Panizzi Preston, Chairman of Messrs. J. Stone & Company, Ltd., Deptford
Sir Frederick Alexander Robertson, Chairman of the Central Council of United Alien Relief Societies
Robert Robertson  Superintending Chemist, Research Dept., Woolwich Arsenal
Herbert Babington Rowell, Member of the Admiralty Shipbuilding Council
Harry Smith, Chairman of the Keighley Board of Management, Ministry of Munitions
Charles John Stewart, Public Trustee
Thomas James Storey, Member of the Committee and Chairman of the Classification Committed of Lloyd's Register of Shipping
Percy Kendall Stothert, Chairman of the West of England Board of Management, Ministry of Munitions
The Rt. Hon. Sir Thomas Vezey Strong  Chairman, City of London Tribunal
Lt.-Col. Campbell Stuart, Vice-Chairman of London Headquarters of British Mission to the United States of America
Charles Sykes, Director of Wool Textile Production and Chairman of the Board of Control of the Worsted Woollen Trades
William Henry Thompson  Scientific Adviser to the Ministry of Food
William Rowan-Thomson, Director of Auxiliary Ships Engines, Controller's Dept., Admiralty
Frank Warner, President of the Silk Association
Lt.-Col. Alfred Cholmeley Earle Welby, Sec. of the Royal Patriotic Fund Corporation

British India
Maj. His Highness Raj Rajeshwar Maharajadhiraja Sumer Singh Bahadur, of Jodhpur

Commonwealth of Australia
James William Barrett  for services in connection with the Australian Branch of the British Red Cross Society in Egypt, etc.
Rear-Admiral William Clarkson  Royal Australian Navy, for services in connection with the control and reorganisation of coastal shipping
Edward Owen Cox, Chairman, Overseas Shipping Committee
Lt.-Col. George Steward, for services to the Commonwealth Government

Dominion of New Zealand
Sir William Lee, Baron Plunket  for services in connection with the New Zealand War Contingent Association

Egypt and the Sudan
Maj. Lee Oliver FitzMaurice Stack  Reserve of Ofc.s, Acting Sirdar and Governor-General of the Sudan

Newfoundland
The Hon. Patrick Thomas McGrath  President of the Legislative Council, Food Controller, Sec. of the Patriotic Fund, and Chairman of the Pensions and Disabilities Board

Crown Colonies, Protectorates, etc. 
The Most Reverend Maurus Caruana, Archbishop, Bishop of Malta
Sir Everard Ferdinand im Thurn  Vice-Chairman, King George and Queen Mary's Club for the Oversea Forces
Brig.-Gen.-General Sir William Henry Manning  Capt.-General and Governor-in-Chief of the Island of Jamaica
Lawrence Aubrey Wallace  Administrator of Northern Rhodesia
Sir Arthur Henderson Young  Governor and Cmdr.-in-Chief of the Straits Settlements

Honorary Knight Cmdr
His Highness Ibrahim, Sultan of the State and Territory of Johor 

 Cmdr. of the Order of the British Empire (CBE) 

 Military Division 

Lt.-Col. John Hubback Anderson, Assistant Director of Medical Services, Australian Imperial Force
Col. Frederick John Angell, Assistant Director of Ordnance Services, Southern Command
Lt.-Col. James Forrest Halkett Carmichael, Assistant Controller, Raw Materials (Non-Ferrous), Ministry of Munitions
Maj. Augustus Basil Holt Clerke, Royal Field Arty., Director, Messrs. Hadfields, Ltd., Sheffield
Maj. The Hon. Leonard Harrison Cripps, 4th Hussars; Assistant Controller, Stores Dept., Ministry of Munitions
Col. Stuart Davidson, Royal Engineers, Chief Technical Examiner for Works Services, War Office
Lt.-Col. Robert Maxwell Dennistoun  Deputy Judge Advocate General, Canadian Forces
Col. Sir William Yorke Foster  Late Assistant Adjutant General, Southern Command
Col. Joseph Gaskell  Vice-Chairman (Acting Chairman), Glamorgan Territorial Force Association
Brevet Col. St. John Corbet Gore 
Lt.-Col. Geoffrey Gladstone Helbert, Staff of High Comm. for South Africa
Maj. Thomas Gerard Hetherington, Services in connection with the origination of Tanks
Lt.-Col. John Tweedy Lewtas, Comm. for Medical Services, Ministry of National Service 
Col. James Reynolds McLean, Deputy Director-General of Recruiting
Col. Valentine Matthews  Inspector of Rest Houses, London District
Col. Robert Dawson Rudolf, Consultant in Medicine, Canadian Army Medical Corps
Col. The Hon. George John Smith, Assistant Director of Contracts, Admiralty; New Zealand Military Forces
Col. Robert Ward Tate, Adjutant-General to the New Zealand Forces
Lt.-Col. Francis William Towle, Royal Army Service Corps; Inspector of Q.M. General's Services; Member of the Tobacco and Matches Control Board
Col. Gerald Verner White, Director of Timber Operations, Canadian Forestry Corps
Lt.-Col. John Williams, Australian Imperial Force; Commanding Anzac Provost Corps

For services in connection with the War in France, Egypt and Salonika 
Hugh Garvin Goligher, Financial Adviser, British Expeditionary Force
Helen Charlotte Isabella Gwynne-Vaughan, Chief Controller, Queen Mary's Army Auxiliary Corps
Lt.-Col. Edward William Horne
Lt.-Col. Sydney George Partridge, Army Printing and Stationery Services, General Headquarters, France

 Civil Division 
John Arthur Aiton, Chairman, Derbyshire Munitions Board of Management
Maj. Charles Aldington, Superintendent of the Line, Great Western Railway
Ernest Joshua Allen, Director, Railway Materials, Ministry of Munitions
Ernest King Allen, Assistant Public Trustee
Richard William Allen  Director and Manager of Messrs. W. H. Allen, Son & Company, Bedford
Lawrence Alma-Tadema, Joint Founder of the Polish Relief Fund for Great Britain
Adelaide Mary Anderson, Principal Lady Inspector of Factories
William James Anderson, Honorary Treasurer, Scottish Branch, British Red Cross Society
Mildred Harriet, Lady Anstruther
John Apsey, Manager, Constructive Dept., H.M. Dockyard, Portsmouth
Cecil Henry Armitage  County Director, Derbyshire, British Red Cross and Order of St. John of Jerusalem
George Henry Ashdown  Deputy Director of Stores, Admiralty
Maj. Frank Ashley, British Red Cross Comm., Malta
Ellen, Lady Askwith, Ladies Auxiliary Committee (Munitions Section), Y.M.C.A. 
Frederick Joseph Bacon  Treasury Valuer and Inspector of Rates
Bernal Bagshawe, Chairman, Leeds Forge Company Ltd., Leeds
David Bain, Controller of Timber Supplies for Gun Ammunition Filling Dept., Ministry of Munitions
Frank Baines  Principal Architect, H.M. Office of Works
James Alan Noel Barlow, Deputy Controller, Labour Supply Dept., Ministry of Munitions
Benjamin Barrios, Oscar Theodore Barrow  Assistant Controller of Finance, Ministry of Munitions
Col. Thomas Elwood Lindesay Bate  Late County Sec., County of London, British Red Cross and Order of St. John of Jerusalem
John Harper Bean, Director, Messrs. A. Harper, Sons and Bean Ltd., Dudley
Gerald Bellhouse, Deputy Chief Inspector of Factories
Blanche Vere, Countess of Bessborough, Honorary Sec., Y.M.C.A. Auxiliary Committee for France
Alfred Carleton Blyth, Managing Director, Hayes Filling Factory, Ministry of Munitions
Hereward Kenius Brackenbury, Manager of Torpedo Shops, Messrs. Sir W. G. Armstrong, Whitworth & Company, Ltd.
Thomas John Bradley, Principal Clerk, Exchequer and Audit Dept.
Benjamin Broadbent 
Lt.-Col. Alfred Claude Bromhead
Arthur David Brooks, Lord Mayor of Birmingham; Chairman of Birmingham Local Tribunal
James Brown, Deputy Chairman and Managing Director, Scott's Shipbuilding and Engineering Company, Ltd. 
Francis Morgan Bryant  Sec. of H.M. the King's Private Sec.'s Office
James Herbert Brydon, Acting County Director, Honorary County Sec. and Treasurer, Cheshire, British Red Cross and Order of St. John of Jerusalem
Lindsay Budd, Chairman, Virgin Metals Committee, Ministry of Munitions
Kathleen Burke
Capt. Sydney Bernard Burney, Assistant Director General of Voluntary Organizations
Geoffrey Butler, Dept. of Information, Foreign Office
Thomas Sivewright Catto, Ministry of Shipping
Fernley John Chamberlain, Assistant Sec. and Chief of Staff to the National Council of Young Men's Christian Associations
Brig.-Gen.-General Harry Anthony Chandos-Pole-Gell, Chairman, Derbyshire War Agricultural Executive Committee
Professor Frederic John Cheshire, Adviser on Scientific Side of Optical Munitions Branch, Ministry of Munitions
Clementine Churchill, Ladies Auxiliary Committee (Munitions Section), Y.M.C.A. 
Maynard Willoughby Colchester-Wemyss  Acting Chief Constable of Gloucestershire
Maj. Charles John Bowen Cooke, Chief Mechanical Engineer, London and North Western Railway
Maj. Edwin Charles Cox, Superintendent of the Line, South Eastern and Chatham Railway
Maj. Edward Yorke Daniel, Sec. of the Historical Section of the Committee of Imperial Defence
Albert Davidson, Managing Director, Messrs. Hattersley and Davidson Ltd., Sheffield
Charles Llewelyn Davies, Assistant Paymaster-General
Ernest Davies, Deputy Inspector under the Aliens Act
Henry William Carless Davis, Deputy Chairman, War Trade Intelligence Dept.
John Samuel Champion Davis  County Director, Devonshire, British Red Cross and Order of St. John of Jerusalem
Howard d'Egville, Honorary Sec. of the United Kingdom Branch of the Empire Parliamentary Association; Comm. under the Military Service (Civil Liabilities) Committee
Rafael Chioquetti
Pedro Costa
Edward Evershed Dendy, Chairman, Semi-manufactured Metals Committee, Ministry of Munitions
Arthur Lewis Dixon, Assistant Sec., Home Office
Capt. The Hon. Charles Joseph Thaddeus Dormer, Royal Navy, Chairman of the Admiralty Licensing Sub-Committee, War Trade Dept.
Col. Charles William Ernest Duncombe  County Director, West Yorkshire, British Red Cross and Order of St. John of Jerusalem
Frances Hermia Durham, Chief Woman Inspector at Central Offices of Employment Dept., Ministry of Labour
Arthur James Dyke, Assistant Sec., Board of Customs and Excise
Agnes Murray Ebden, Deputy President, Hastings Division, British Red Cross and Order of St. John of Jerusalem
Ethel Edgar, Ladies Auxiliary Committee (Munitions Section), Y.M.C.A. 
George Edwards, Auditor and Controller, Imperial Munitions Board, Canada
William James Evans, Principal Clerk, Sec.'s Dept., Admiralty
Peter Dewar Ewing, General Manager, Ailsa Shipbuilding Company, Troon
John Edward Ferard, Assistant Sec. (Officiating Sec.), Judicial and Public Dept., India Office
Capt. Matthew Benjamin Dipnall Ffinch  Assistant Chief Constable in Charge of Special Constabulary, Essex
William John Fieldhouse 
Edward FitzGerald, Assistant to Chairman, Imperial Munitions Board, Canada
William Joseph Fitzherbert-Brockholes  Chairman, Lancashire War Agricultural Executive Committee
Lt.-Col. Herbert Lindsay Fitzpatrick, Red Cross Comm., Salonika
Horace Shepherd Folker, Head of Equipment Dept., Headquarters Staff, British Red Cross Society, London
Maj. John Henry Follows, Acting General Superintendent, Midland Railway
Edward Rodolph Forber, Sec., Military Service (Civil Liabilities) Committee
George Herbert Fowler, Hydrographic Dept., Admiralty
Capt. George Charles Frederick, Royal Navy, Shipping Intelligence Ofc., Liverpool
George Samuel Fry, Formerly Accountant-General of the Board of Trade; Member of the Coal Exports Committee
Thomas Alexander Fyfe, Sheriff Substitute of Lanarkshire; Chairman, Glasgow Munitions Tribunal
Frank Walls Garnett  President of the Royal College of Veterinary Surgeons
Lt.-Col. Frank Garrett  Chairman, Messrs. Garrett and Sons, Leiston
Heathcote William Garrod, Deputy Controller, Labour Regulation Dept., Ministry of Munitions
Laura Gwendolen Gascoigne, Commandant, Lotherton Hall Auxiliary Hospital, Aberford, West Yorkshire
Stephen Gaselee, Dept. of Information, Foreign Office
Mager Frederic Gauntlett  Late Sec., Shipyard Labour Dept., Admiralty
loan Gwilym Gibbon, Principal of the Dept. dealing with Military Service Tribunals, Local Government Board
Victoria Florence de Burgh Gibbs, Vice-President, Long Ashton Division of Somersetshire, British Red Cross and Order of St. John of Jerusalem
David Gilmour, Formerly Resident Engineer, now Member of Board of Management, H.M. Factory, Gretna, Ministry of Munitions
Henry Glendinning, Chemical Director, Messrs. Brunner Mond and Co., Limited, Northwich
Lewis Gordon, Deputy Controller, Small Arms Ammunition, Ministry of Munitions
Col. George Joachim, Viscount Goschen, Director of Labour Division, Food Production Dept.
Robert Ernest Graves, Deputy Comm. of Trade Exemptions Dept., Ministry of National Service
Maj. William Wylie Grierson, Chief Engineer, Great Western Railway
Rosamund, Lady Henry Grosvenor, Ladies Auxiliary Committee (Munitions Section), Y.M.C.A. 
Maj. Anselm Verner Lee Guise, Director of Stores, British Red Cross Society, Boulogne
Frances Bett, Lady Hadfield, Donor and Administrator, No. 5 Hospital, Wimereux, France
Arthur Edward Hadley, Assistant Controller of Inspection of Munitions, Ministry of Munitions
Ernest Varley Haigh, Controller, Trench Warfare Supply Dept., Ministry of Munitions
Arthur Henry Hall, Director of Torpedoes and Mines Production, Controller's Dept., Admiralty
John Harrison, Chairman of the City of Edinburgh Local Tribunal
Ralph Endersby Harwood, Sec. of the War Trade Statistical Dept.
William Hawk  Chairman, Cornwall War Agricultural Executive Committee
Alfred Ernest William Hazel  Deputy Controller, Priority Dept., Ministry of Munitions
Alexander Pearce Higgins  Lecturer on International Law at Cambridge, and President of the Society of Public Teachers of Law
Professor William Richard Hodgkinson  Professor of Chemistry and Metallurgy, Ordnance College, Woolwich
Arthur William Holmes, Director of Contracts, Royal Commission on Wheat Supplies
Collingwood Hope  Chairman, Essex Appeal Tribunal
John Wilson Hope, Chairman of the Committee for the Purchase of Army Camp Refuse
Leonard Thomas Horne, Assistant Sec., Ministry of Pensions
Lancelot Worthy Horne, Superintendent of the Line, London & North Western Railway
George Henry Hunt  Accountant, Treasury
Summers Hunter, Member of the Admiralty Shipbuilding Council
Cyril William Hurcomb, Deputy Director of Commercial Services, Ministry of Shipping
Rear-Admiral Edward Fitzmaurice Inglefield, Royal Navy, Sec. of Lloyd's Register of Shipping
Daniel Jackson, Partner and Head of Shipyard, Messrs. Denny Brothers, Dumbarton
Lt.-Cmdr. Basil Oliver Jenkins  Member in charge of Aviation, British War Mission, United States of America
Walter St. David Jenkins, Assistant Director of Contracts, Admiralty
Harry Marshall Jonas, Member of Valuation Advisory Committee, Controlled Establishment Branch, Ministry of Munitions
Charles Henry Jones, Registrar-General of Shipping and Seamen
Frederick McCulloch Jowitt
Harold Godfrey Judd, Deputy Controller, Contracts Dept., Ministry of Munitions
Walter George Kent, of Messrs. George Kent, Ltd., Luton
Robert Killin, Superintendent of the Line, Caledonian Railway
Alfred Clive Lawrence, Head of the Intelligence Branch of the Procurator-General's Dept.
Florence Edith Victoria Leach, Controller of Inspections, Women's Army Auxiliary Corps
Rudolf Gustav Karl Lempfert  Superintendent of the Forecast Division, Meteorological Office
Norman Alexander Leslie, Ministry of Shipping
Edgar Stanford London, Deputy Chief Inspector of Taxes, Inland Revenue
Arthur Lucas, Deputy Director, Dept. of Import Restrictions, Board of Trade
William Joseph Luke, Shipyard Director, Messrs. John Brown & Company, Ltd., Clydebank
William Royse Lysaght  Technical Adviser, Non-Ferrous Materials Dept., Ministry of Munitions
Horacio George Arthur Mackie, His Majesty's Consul-General, Buenos Aires
James Borrowman MacLean, Controller, Gun Manufacture, Ministry of Munitions
William Turner MacLellan  Assistant Controller, Iron and Steel Production, Ministry of Munitions
Frederick Larkins MacLeod, Adviser on Foreign Iron Ores, Ministry of Munitions
Terence Charles Macnaghten, Principal Clerk, Colonial Office
Charles Cornelius Maconochie  Sheriff of the Lothians and Peebles; Chairman of the Lothian Appeal Tribunal
Edmund John Maginness  Manager, Constructive Dept., H.M. Dockyard, Chatham
James Rochfort Maguire, Ladies Auxiliary Committee (Munitions Section), Y.M.C.A. 
George Malcolm
Alfred Mansfield, Director of Oils and Fats
James Marr  Member of the Admiralty Shipbuilding Council
Thomas Rodgerson Marsden, Managing Director, Messrs. Platt Brothers & Company, Oldham
Wing-Capt. Edward Alexander Dimsdale Masterman, Royal Naval Air Service
Arthur Stanley Mather  Chairman, Lancashire (West Derby Hundred) Appeal Tribunal
Richard Edward Lloyd Maunsell, Mechanical Engineer, South Eastern and Chatham Railway
Oliver Hill McCowen  Sec. in Charge of Y.M.C.A. work in France
The Hon. Henry Duncan McLaren  Director, Area Organisation, Ministry of Munitions
William Bentley McMillan  Provost of Greenock
Harry Bell Measures  Director of Barrack Construction, War Office
His Honour Judge Francis Hamilton Mellor  Chairman, Lancashire (Salford Hundred) Appeal Tribunal
Frank Herbert Mitchell, Assistant Director, Official Press Bureau
Maj. Robert Mitchell, Director of Training, Ministry of Pensions
William Mitchell-Thomson  Director of the Restriction of Enemy Supplies Dept.
Col. James Alexander Lawrence Montgomery, British Red Cross Comm., East Africa
Lt.-Col. Charles Langbridge Morgan, Late Chief Engineer, London, Brighton and South Coast Railway
Hopkin Morgan  Chairman, Glamorganshire County Council; Mayor of Neath; Chairman, West Glamorganshire Appeal Tribunal
Thomas Harry Mottram, Divisional Inspector of Mines; Chairman of Colliery Recruiting Courts, Yorkshire and North Midlands Division
William Arthur Mount  Civil Member of Claims Commission, War Office
Conrad James Naef, Deputy Accountant-General of the Navy
Daniel Neylan, Chief Accountant, War Office; late Financial Adviser to the Salonika Expeditionary Force
Thomas Norton  Chairman, Yorkshire West Riding Appeal Tribunal
Arthur Eugene O'Neill, Ministry of Shipping
Lt.-Col. Claude Bowes Palmer  County Director, Northumberland and Durham, British Red Cross and Order of St. John of Jerusalem
Maj. Edward Howard Thornbrough Parsons, Chief Constable, Metropolitan Police
James Peech, Adviser on Shell Steel, Ministry of Munitions
His Honour Judge George Bettesworth Piggott, Chairman of Special Local Tribunal for London and Member of London Appeal Tribunal
Henry Howard Piggots, Assistant Sec., Parliamentary and General, Ministry of Munitions
Charles Ralph Pinder, Resident Engineer, H.M. Factory, Oldbury; formerly Construction Manager, H.M. Factory, Queensferry, and H.M. Factory, Avonmouth, Ministry of Munitions
Henry Pledge, Assistant Director of Naval Construction, Admiralty
William Jackson Pope  Professor of Chemistry, University of Cambridge; Member of Panel of Board of Invention and Research, Admiralty
Helen Matilda, Lady Procter, Chairman, Munition Workers Welfare Committee, Y.W.C.A.
James Railton, Partner in the Firm of Messrs. Topham, Jones and Railton
Harry Rawson  Chairman, City of Edinburgh Territorial Force Association
George Grey Rea  Member of the President of the Board of Agriculture's Committee Food Production Advisory
Lt.-Col. Hugh Reid  Member of War Executive and of the Scottish National Red Cross and Ralston Hospital Committee of the Scottish Branch, British Red Cross Society
Arthur John Relton, Member of the Aircraft Insurance Committee
Brevet Lt.-Col. Thomas Duncan Rhind, Controller of Statistics, Ministry of National Service
John Richie Richmond, Managing Director of Messrs. J. M. Weir, Ltd., Cathcart
Gervase Henry Roberts, Superintendent, Mechanical Engineering Dept., Woolwich Arsenal
John Robertson, Provost of the Burgh of Paisley; Chairman of the local National Service and Food Control Committees; Member of Appeal Tribunal
William Robinson, Financial Sec., India Office
William Arthur Robinson  Assistant Sec., H.M. Office of Works
Corisande Evelyn Vere, Baroness Rodney, Y.M.C.A. Worker
Archibald John Campbell Ross, Member of the Admiralty Shipbuilding Council
John Rowland  Late Chief Comm. of National Service, Wales
Matthew Adkins Rundell, Government representative on the London group of War Risks Associations; Government representative on the Fishing Vessels War Risks Insurance Association
Edward Russell Clarke  Expert Adviser to the Naval Staff on Wireless Telegraphy
Nils Percy Patrick Sandberg, Director of Inspection of Steel (Land Service), Ministry of Munitions, and Associate Member of Ordnance Committee
Charles John Ough Sanders, Superintendent for Wrecks and Loss of Life at Sea; in the Marine Dept., Board of Trade
Capt. William Stephen Sanders, Sec. to the British Section of the International Socialist Party
William Samuel Sarel, Assistant Accountant-General of the Navy
Maj. Finlay Forbes Scott, Superintendent of the Line, London, Brighton and South Coast Railway
Col. John Scott-Riddell  Red Cross Comm. for North Eastern District of Scotland
Albert Senior  Principal Partner, Messrs. G., Senior & Sons, Ltd., Sheffield
John Davenport Siddeley, Managing Director of the Siddeley-Deasy Co., Ltd.
William Anker Simmons  Agricultural Adviser, Ministry of Food
Arthur William Smallwood
Frederick Smith, Assistant Director of Materials and Priority, Controller's Dept., Admiralty, New Zealand Expeditionary Force
Launcelot Eustace Smith, Chairman and Managing Director, Messrs. Smith's Dock Company, Ltd., Tyne Branch
Thomas Octave Murdoch Sopwith, Chairman and Test and Experimental Manager of Sopwith Aviation Co., Ltd.
William Spens, Foreign Trade Dept.
Ernest Edward William Squires, General Manager, Metropolitan Carriage, Wagon & Finance Company, Ltd., Birmingham
Josiah Charles Stamp  Assistant Sec. to the Board of Inland Revenue
Lockhart Stephens  County Director, Hampshire British Red Cross and Order of St. John of Jerusalem
Frances Louise Stevenson, Private Sec. to the Prime Minister
Thomas Henry Craig Stevenson  Superintendent of Statistics, General Register Office
Mary Margaret Stewart-Mackenzie
William Chester Still, Senior Partner of Messrs. W. M. Still and Sons
John William Stone, Surveyor of Lands, Director of Works Dept., Admiralty
Lucy Granville Streatfeild, Member of Soldiers Dependants Assessment Appeals Committee
John Stuart, Managing Director, Messrs. Ross, Ltd., London
The Hon. Violet Stuart-Wortley, Ladies Sec. to the Headquarters Committee, Y.M.C.A. 
The Hon. Reginald Gilbert Murray Talbot, Chairman, London Munitions Tribunal
Frank Tatlow, Deputy General Manager, Midland Railway
Lt.-Col. Percy Crosland Tempest, Chief Engineer, South Eastern and Chatham Railway
Capt. William Hugh Tomasson  Chief Constable of Nottinghamshire and Acting Inspector of Constabulary
Wynn Harold Tregoning, Ministry of Shipping; a Membef of the Ship Licensing Committee
Joseph Harling Turner 
John James Virgo, National Field Sec. to the Y.M.C.A. 
Lt.-Col. David Wallace  Red Cross Comm. for Eastern District of Scotland
Hugh Walpole
Evelyn Mayura Walters, Honorary Sec., Kensington Division, British Red Cross and Order of St. John of Jerusalem; Organiser of the Weir Hospital, Balham
Lady Susan Elizabeth Clementine Waring, Donor and Administrator, Auxiliary Hospital for Convalescent Ofc.s, Lennel, Coldstream, Berwick
Maj. Henry Angus Watson, General Superintendent, North Eastern Railway
Alexander Strahan Watt, Lawrence WeaverDirector of Supplies Division, Food Production Dept.
Harry James Webb, Royal Corps of Naval Constructors; Chief Constructor and Superintendent, Dockyard Branch, Controller's Dept., Admiralty
Philip George Lancelot Webb, Deputy Controller of Petrol Dept., Board of Trade
Wilfred Howard Williams, Director of Inland Transport, Ministry of Munitions
Col. Frederic Herbert Williamson, Royal Engineers, Director of Army Postal Service (Home); Principal Clerk, Sec.'s Office, General Post Office
John William Willis-Bund  Chairman, Worcestershire County Council; Chairman, Worcestershire Appeal Tribunal; Chairman, Worcestershire National Relief Fund
Horace John Wilson, Sec. to Committee on Production, Ministry of Labour
John James Withers
Humbert Wolfe, Controller, Labour Regulation Dept., Ministry of Munitions
Edith Amelia, Baroness Wolverton, Ladies Auxiliary Committee (Munitions Section), Y.M.C.A. 
Professor Thomas Barlow Wood, Drapers Professor of Agriculture in the University of Cambridge; Adviser on Meat Production to the President of the Board of Agriculture, and Chief Executive Ofc., Army Cattle Purchase Scheme
Alfred Woodgate, Assistant Sec. to the Ministry of Shipping
Raymond Wybrow Woods, Chief Clerk, Treasury Solicitor's Dept.
Thomas Worthington, Late Head of the Commercial Intelligence Dept. of the Board of Trade
Maj. Lionel Maling Wynch  Sec. to Red Cross Comm., France
Lt.-Col. Charles John Wyndham, Late County Director, Sussex, British Red Cross and Order of St. John of Jerusalem
Harold Edgar Yarrow, Director of Messrs. Yarrow & Company
John Horatio Yolland, Chief of Staff of County Director, Kent, British Red Cross and Order of St. John of Jerusalem
George Udny Yule, Director of Requirements, Ministry of Food

For services in connection with the War in France, Egypt and Salonika 
Arthur Beagley Beavis, Financial Adviser, British Salonika Force
Rachel, Countess of Dudley, Honorary Superintendent, No. 32 Stationary Hospital, France; Honorary Superintendent, Expeditionary Force, Ofc.s' Clubs and Rest Houses
Lady Mabelle Annie Egerton, in charge of Station Coffee Stall, Rouen
Robert Godfrey Peckitt, Chief Mechanical Engineer, Egyptian State Railways

British India
Jeanie, Lady Meston, Head of the branch of the Red Cross in Allahabad
Lt.-Col. Frank Popham Young  Indian Army, Comm., Rawalpindi Division, Punjab
Sir Robert Swan Highet, Agent, East Indian Railway, Calcutta
Nawab Sir Faridoon Daula Bahadur  Assistant Political Minister to His Highness the Nizam's Government
Montagu de Pomeroy Webb  Manager, Forbes, Forbes, Campbell and Co., Karachi, Bombay Presidency

Commonwealth of Australia
Mary Antill, Organiser, War Chest Fund, Sydney
Henry Ebenezer Budden, Organiser, Overseas Australian Comforts Funds
Guillaume Daniel Delprat, for services in connection with steel supplies, etc.
Mary, Lady Hennessy, Organiser, Victorian Branch, Australian Comforts Fund
Beatrice Henty, Sec., Australian Comforts Fund, Melbourne
Maj. Frank de Villiers Lamb, for services in connection with the Australian Branch of the British Red Cross Society in England and Egypt
Clare Lyle
Hugh Victor McKay, for services in connection with war industries
Orme Masson
Eliza Fraser Mitchell, for services in connection with the Australian Branch of the British Red Cross Society in England and Australia
Lt.-Col. William James Norman Oldershaw, for services in connection with the Commonwealth Shipping Board
Frances Mary Woolcott, Honorary Organiser of the Button Fund
William James Young, for services in connection with Shipping

Dominion of New Zealand
Jacobina Luke
Christina Allan Massey
Robert Howard Nolan, Honorary Sec., New Zealand Soldiers' Club
Theresa Dorothea, Lady Ward
Oriana Fanny Wilson

Egypt and the Sudan
Ernest Macleod Dowson, Director-General of Survey Dept.
Cecil Gordon Crawley, in charge of the Government Arsenals
Wasey Sterry, Chief Justice in the Sudan
George Eustace Burnett-Stuart, Director of Personnel in Ministry of Interior

Newfoundland
The Hon. James Augustus Clift  Acting Minister of Agriculture and Mines, Vice-Chairman of the Standing Committee of the Patriotic Association, Member of the Recruiting Committee and the Pensions Board

Union of South Africa
Hester Marion Carter, of the Red Cross and Comforts Committee, Cape Town
Ernest Chappell, Chairman of the Johannesburg Branch of the Comforts Committee
Douglas Christopherson, Vice-Chairman, Johannesburg Local Committee, Governor-General's Fund, and Chairman of the Disabled Soldiers Board, Johannesburg
The Hon. Eleanor Birch Wilson-Fox, Chairman, South African Comforts Committee in London
Jessie Dodd, Lady Rose-Innes
Thomas Slingsby Nightingale  Sec. to the High Comm. in London for the Union of South Africa
Evelyn Ashley Wallers, President of the Transvaal Chamber of Mines

Crown Colonies, Protectorates, etc  
Andrew Agnew, Chairman of River Craft Committee, Member of Food Control and Shipping Committee, and Commandant of the Civil Guard, Straits Settlements
Thomas Alexander Vans Best  Administering the Government of the Leeward Islands
Ethel Dorothy Bowring, for services to the East African Expeditionary Force
Francis George Bury, Honorary Treasurer, King George and-Queen Mary's Club for the Oversea Forces
Thomas Fraser Burrowes, Comptroller of Customs and Receiver of Enemy Estates, Nigeria
William Morris Carter, Chief Justice of His Majesty's High Court of Uganda, and Chairman of the Uganda Supplies Board
Elizabeth Lydia Rosabelle, Lady Clifford, for charitable services in the Gold Coast Colony
Henry Lawson De Mel, for services to the Government of Ceylon
Sir Frederick Evans  for services to the Government of Gibraltar
Henry Cowper Gollan  Attorney-General and Chairman of the Food Committee of the Colony of Trinidad and Tobago
Richard Allmond Jeffrey Goode, Sec. to the Administration, Northern Rhodesia
Francis.Charles Jenkin, Deputy Superintendent, Special Police Reserve, Hong Kong
Reginald Fleming Johnston, District Ofc. and Magistrate, Weihaiwei
Joseph Horsford Kemp, Attorney-General of the Colony of Hong Kong
Albert Ernest Kitson, Director, Geological Survey Dept., Gold Coast Colony
Henry Marks, Member of the Executive and Legislative Councils of the Colony of Fiji; for services to various patriotic funds
Mary Ethel, Baroness Methuen, for services to the sick and wounded in Malta
Alice, Lady Miles, President of the-Red Cross and other funds, Gibraltar
Nana Ofori Atta, Paramount Chief of Akin Abuakwa; for services to the Government of the Gold-Coast Colony
Alexander Ransford Slater  Colonial Sec. of the Gold Coast Colony, for special services in connection with recruiting
Hippolyte Louis Wiehe du Coudray Souchon, Representative in London of the Mauritius' Chamber of Agriculture

Honorary Cmdrs of the said Most Excellent Order
Abubakar Garbai, Shehu of Borno, for services in connection with the Cameroon Campaign
Sheikh Ali bin Salim, Assistant Liwali, Mombasa
Muhammadu Abba, Emir of Yola, for services in connection with the Cameroon Campaign

 Officer of the Order of the British Empire (OBE) 

 Member of the Order of the British Empire (MBE) 

 Royal Red Cross 

 First Class (RRC) 

Millicent Acton, Matron, Territorial Force Nursing Service (T.F.N.S.)
Margaret Anderson, Head Sister, Australian Army Nursing Service
Edith Elizabeth Appleton, Acting Sister, Civil Hospital Reserve, St. Bartholomew's
Ellen Elizabeth Baldrey, Sister, Queen Alexandra's Imperial Military Nursing Service Reserve (Q.A.I.M.N.S.R.)
Marian Winfield Bannister, Sister, Q.A.I.M.N.S.R.
Frederickke Wilhelmina Christopherson, Assistant Matron, Q.A.I.M.N.S.R.
Mary Constance Clark, Superintending Sister, Queen Alexandra's Royal Naval Nursing Service (Q.A.R.N.N.S.)
Grace Corder, Sister, Q.A.I.M.N.S.R.
Helen Cousins, Matron, 10, Palace Green, W. London
Elizabeth Joan Cumming, Matron, Army Nursing Service Reserve
Nora Dalrymple, Sister, Q.A.I.M.N.S.R.
Ethel Sarah Davidson, Matron, Australian Army Nursing Service (A.A.N.S)
Annie Blackley Denton, Acting Matron, Q.A.I.M.N.S.R.
Helen Dey, Acting Sister, Queen Alexandra's Imperial Military Nursing Service (Q.A.I.M.N.S.)
Clarice Molyneux Dickson, Sister, Australian Army Nursing Service
Maud Alice Dunn, Sister, T.F.N.S.
Nora Easby, Acting Sister, Civil Hospital Reserve, St. Thomas Hospital
Lily Agnes Ephgrave, Staff Nurse, Q.A.I.M.N.S. (retired)
Gertrude Annie Flood, Matron, Military Orthopaedic Hospital, Shepherd's Bush
Mary. Gladys Connie Foley, Sister, Q.A.I.M.N.S.
Dorothy Penrose Foster, Sister, T.F.N.S.
Myra Goodeve, Matron, Canadian Army Medical Corps
Frances Mary Hall, Acting Matron, Q.A.I.M.N.S. (retired)
Jane Anne Hannah, Sister, T.F.N.S.
Elsie Emma Harlow, Sister, Q.A.I.M.N.S.R.
Ethel Harwood, Sister, Q.A.I.M.N.S.R.
Katie Payne Hodge, Sister, Q.A.I.M.N.S.R., Australia
Minnie Holmes, Sister, T.F.N.S.
Ethel Julia Marion Keene, Q.A.I.M.N.S.
Estelle Venner Keogh, Staff Nurse, Q.A.I.M.N.S.R., Australia
Mary Walker Langlands, Sister, T.F.N.S.
Dorothy Ann Laughton, Sister, T.F.N.S.
Gertiude Lulham, Sister, T.F.N.S.
Margaret Joan Leonara Lyons, Acting Sister, Q.A.I.M.N.S.R.
Elizabeth Lusk Macaulay, Acting Sister, Civil Hospital Reserve, Edinburgh Mental Hospital
Cordelia MacKay, Acting Matron, Q.A.I.M.N.S.
Janet McGregor McDonald, Nursing Sister, Canadian Army Medical Corps
Katherine Violet Saile Merriman, Sister, T.F.N.S.
Isabel Muirhead Muir, Sister, T.F.N.S.
Gertrude Napper, Staff Nurse, Q.A.I.M.N.S.R.
Alice Nye, Matron, Nursing Service
Ida O'Dwyer, Head Sister, Australian Army Nursing Service
Mildred Alice Oakley, Sister, Acting Matron, T.F.N.S.
Elizabeth Orr, Assistant Matron, Q.A.I.M.N.S.R.
Rachel Patterson, Matron, Nyasaland Nursing Service
Kathleen Agnes Prendergast, Acting Matron, Q.A.I.M.N.S.R.
Minnie Farquharson Proctor, Sister, Australian Army Nursing Service
Elizabeth Rogers, Acting Sister, Q.A.I.M.N.S.R.
Violet Rogers, Sister, T.F.N.S. 
Alice Rowe, Sister, Q.A.I.M.N.S.
Amelia Julia, Lady Sargant  Commandant and Matron, St. Anselm's Hospital, Walmer
Eva Owen Schofield, Acting Sister, Civil Hospital Reserve, Edinburgh Royal Infirmary
Helen Donaldson Shearer, Nursing Sister, Canadian Army Medical Corps
Margaret Helen Smyth, Sister, Q.A.I.M.N.S.
Alice Violet Stewart, Senior Nursing Sister, Nursing Service
Louisa Stobo, Head Sister, Australian Army Nursing Service
Marky Minto Tait, Acting Sister, Civil Hospital Reserve, Glasgow Western Infirmary
Jean Urquhart, Matron, Canadian Army Medical Corps
Margaret Whitson, Matron, British Red Cross Society
Maude Willes  Sister, Q.A.I.M.N.S.
Eva Florence Wilson, Staff Nurse, Q.A.I.M.N.S.R.
Nella Myrtle Wilson, Assistant Matron, Canadian Army Medical Corps
Adelaide Anne Wood, Sister, Q.A.I.M.N.S.R.

Second Class (Associate RRC)

Maud Alice Abraham, Acting Sister, Civil Hospital Reserve, Middlesex Hospital
Louisa Joyce Acton, Town Hall Hospital, Torquay
Helen Addison, Sister, Q.A.I.M.N.S.R.
Betty Angel, Acting Sister, Civil Hospital Reserve, Royal Free Hospital
Esther Lydia Ashby, Sister, T.F.N.S.
Ellen Atkinson, Staff Nurse, Q.A.I.M.N.S.R.
Alfreeda Jean Attrill, Nursing Sister, Canadian Nursing Service
Frances Ethel Bach, Acting Sister, Civil Hospital Reserve, David Lewis Hospital, Liverpool
Annie Baillie, Nursing Sister, Canadian Army Medical Corps
Geraldine Catherine Ball, Acting Sister, Q.A.I.M.N.S.R.
Annie Barns, Acting Sister, Civil Hospital Reserve, London Hospital
Florence Marion Bartleet, Acting Matron, Q.A.I.M.N.S.R.
Francis Ethel Barwell, Acting Sister, Q.A.I.M.N.S.R.
Henrietta Bauman, Sister, South African Medical Nursing Service 
Susan Baxter, Acting Sister, Civil Hospital Reserve, Mile End Infirmary
Mary du Caurroy, The Duchess of Bedford, Woburn Auxiliary Hospital, Bedford
Beatrice Emily Beeson, Special Probationers Nursing Service
Louisa Bennett, Sister, British Red Cross Society
Marianne Ballingall Bennett, Assistant Matron, Q.A.I.M.N.S.R.
Mother Mary Berckmans, Matron, Military Hospital, Waterloo Park, Lancashire
Louisa Harriett Berry, Staff Nurse, T.F.N.S.
Elizabeth May Best, Nursing Sister, Canadian Army Medical Corps, Nursing Service
Florence Ethel Bickmore, Sister, British Red Cross Society
Frances May Billington, Acting Sister, Q.A.I.M.N.S.R., New Zealand
Annie Blackburn, Staff Nurse, T.F.N.S.
Ada Blackmail, London Hospital
Emily Coleclough Blake, Nursing Sister, South African Medical Nursing Service 
Elsie Blest, Voluntary Aid Detachment
Constance Boschoff, Staff Nurse, Clandon Park, Guildford
Emily Caroline Clifford Bramwell, Matron, The Red House Auxiliary Hospital, Leatherhead
Margaret Allen Brander, Sister, T.F.N.S.
May Gertrude Broadbent, Voluntary Aid Detachment
Katharine Alice Broade, Sister, Q.A.I.M.N.S. (retired)
Flora McDonald Browning, Acting Sister, Civil Hospital Reserve, Royal Infirmary, Sunderland
Mabel Emma Bruce, Nursing Sister, Canadian Army Medical Corps, Nursing Service
Amy Ada Bryant, Matron, Benfleet Hall Auxiliary Hospital, Sutton
Mathilde Bull, Sister, T.F.N.S.
Marguerite Eveline Bunyard, Voluntary Aid Detachment
Ellen Josephine Burke, Staff Nurse, Civil Hospital Reserve, Royal Victoria Hospital, Belfast
Georgia Burke-Roche, Sister, Nursing Service
Helen Caig, Acting Sister, Civil Hospital Reserve, Queens Hospital, Birmingham
Nina Cairns, Sister, Q.A.I.M.N.S.R.
Alexine Cameron, Sister, T.F.N.S.
Edith Clare Cameron, Sister, Australian Army Nursing Service (AANS)
Helen Margaret Cameron, Sister, Q.A.I.M.N.S.R.
Eve Mary Campbell, The Hon. Nursing Sister, East Africa Nursing Service 
Mary Roslyn Carr, Matron, British Red Cross Society
Edith Emma Dorothy Carter, Acting Sister, Q.A.I.M.N.S.R.
Stella Caulfield, Voluntary Aid Detachment
Kathleen Cawler, Staff Nurse, Q.A.I.M.N.S.R.
Sarah E. Chadwick, Sister, St. Johns Hospital, Southport
Lily Langshaw Chapman, Sister, T.F.N.S.
Julie Mary Clancy, Staff Nurse, Civil Hospital Reserve, London Hospital
Marguerite Gérard-Clément, Sister (late A.N.S.), Military Hospital, Newcastle upon Tyne
Mary Fynes Clinton, Voluntary Aid Detachment
Lynda Mary Coates, Acting Sister, Civil Hospital Reserve, Royal Devon and Exeter Hospital
Jessie Alexander Connal, Sister, T.F.N.S.
Isabel Connor, Nursing Sister, Australian Army Medical Corps, Nursing Service
Ianthe Constantinides, Voluntary Aid Detachment
Edith Marie Cooper, Acting Sister. Q.A.I.M.N.S.R.
Amy Isabel Coward, Sister, T.F.N.S.
Margaret Rosetta Cox, Sister, T.F.N.S.
Isobella Craig, Acting Sister, Civil Hospital Reserve, Glasgow Royal Infirmary
Mary Craig, Staff Nurse, South African Medical Nursing Service 
Helen Patterson Crawford, Sister, T.F.N.S.
Mary Matthewson Crichton, Acting Sister, Civil Hospital Reserve, Manchester Royal Infirmary
Annie Crooks, Acting Sister, Civil Hospital Reserve, London Hospital
Jean P. Cullen, Nursing Sister, Queen Alexandra's Royal Naval Nursing Service Reserve (Q.A.R.N.N.S.R.)
Ethel Mary Cumberledge, Acting Sister, Civil Hospital Reserve, St. Bartholomew's
Agnes Elizabeth Cummings, Acting Sister, Q.A.I.M.N.S.R.
Constance Cundell, Voluntary Aid Detachment
Mary Curran, Acting Sister, Civil Hospital Reserve, Royal City of Dublin Hospital
Elsie Frances Curtis, Sister, Q.A.I.M.N.S.R.
Clare Daglish, Voluntary Aid Detachment
May Dale, Nursing Sister, East Africa Nursing Service
Henrietta Daly, Acting Sister, Civil Hospital Reserve, London Hospital
Marianne Emaline Dann, Matron, Red Cross Hospital, Hillfield, Reigate
Christina Anderson Davidson, Staff Nurse, T.F.N.S.
Mary Anne Davies, Sister, Q.A.I.M.N.S.R.
Isabel May Day, Acting Sister, Q.A.I.M.N.S.R.
Alma Margaret Mary Denny, Sister, Q.A.I.M.N.S.R.
Christina McI. Dewar, Nursing Sister, Q.A.R.N.N.S.R.
Gertrude Marion Doherty, Staff Nurse, Australian Army Nursing Service
Edith Victoria Donaldson, Acting Sister, Q.A.I.M.N.S.R., Australia
Helen Louise Drinkwater, Sister, T.F.N.S.
Mary Annie Earp, Voluntary Aid Detachment
Alice Mary Eastes, Acting Sister, Q.A.I.M.N.S.R.
Mary Richmond Easton, Matron, Headquarters, London
Mary Eksteen, Staff Nurse, South African Medical Nursing Service 
Christabel Mary Ellis, Voluntary Aid Detachment
Mary Emerson, Sister, Hildens Military Hospital, Haslemere
Bessie Ernest, Voluntary Aid Detachment
Eliza Ann Everett, Nurse, Regents Park Hospital, Southampton
Margaret Fanny Fell, Sister, T.F.N.S.
Helen Mary Fergusson, Sister, T.F.N.S.
Charlotte Fitzmayer, Sister, Q.A.I.M.N.S. (T)
Nora Fitzpatrick, Nurse (Nursing Services), Dublin
May Armstrong Fletcher, Staff Nurse, Q.A.I.M.N.S.R.
Jean Forbes, Staff Nurse, Q.A.I.M.N.S.R.
Ella Foskett, Sister, T.F.N.S.
Helen Leila Fox, Acting Sister, Q.A.I.M.N.S.R.
Winifred Heath Fray, Nursing Sister, Canadian Army Medical Corps
Jessica Lillington Freshfield, Sister, British Red Cross Society
Kleo Friend, Commandant, The Castle Auxiliary Hospital, Ryde, Isle of Wight
Mary Furdham, Staff Nurse, Q.A.I.M.N.S.R.
Jean Fyfe, Asst Matron, Q.A.I.M.N.S.R.
Margaret Mary Galbraith, Asst Matron, Canadian Army Medical Corps, Nursing Service
Margaret Gall, Sister, T.F.N.S.
Elsie Vera Orby Gascoigne, Acting Sister, Civil Hospital Reserve, St. Bartholomew's Hospital
Mabel Emily Gascoine, Acting Sister, Civil Hospital Reserve, West Hertfordshire Hospital
Elsie Georgina Gawith, Voluntary Aid Detachment
Kathleen Gawler, Staff Nurse, Q.A.I.M.N.S.R.
Janet Elizabeth Giles, Matron, British Red Cross Society
Charlotte Mary Gooding, Sister, Kingston, Surbiton and District Red Cross Hospital, New Maiden
Katherine Marsh Gordon, Voluntary Aid Detachment Member
Edith Mary Goss, Lady Superintendent, Palace Auxiliary Hospital, Gloucester
Jemima Helen Grant, Acting Sister, Q.A.I.M.N.S.R.
Dora Granville Grayson, Acting Sister, Q.A.I.M.N.S.R.
Dorothy Greig, Special Probationers Nursing Service
Mary Ellen Grow, Sister, Oakenshaw Hospital, Surbiton
Edith Hadfield, Acting Sister, Civil Hospital Reserve, Hull Royal Infirmary
Mary Beatrice Hall, Staff Nurse, Q.A.I.M.N.S.R.
Jessie Jean Halliday, Staff Nurse, T.F.N.S.
Florence Harley, Sister, Q.A.I.M.N.S.R.
Eliza Agnes Harrison, Assistant Matron, T.F.N.S.
Sybil M. Harry, Sister, Headquarters, London
Lizzie Haxell, Acting Sister, Q.A.I.M.N.S.R.
Sarah Heaney, Nursing Sister, Canadian Army Medical Corps
Frances Henderson, Voluntary Aid Detachment
Dorothy Henderson, Nursing Sister, Q.A.R.N.N.S.
Helen Catherine Henry, Special Probationer Nursing Service
Georgina Hester, Acting Sister, Civil Hospital Reserve, University College Hospital
Ruth Hewlett, Voluntary Aid Detachment
Margaret Agnes Hilhard, Acting Sister, Civil Hospital Reserve, Guy's Hospital
Elizabeth Bridges Hill, Acting Sister, Q.A.I.M.N.S.R.
Norah Hill, Voluntary Aid Detachment
Gertrude Hind, Sister, T.F.N.S.
Ethel Madeline Gertrude Hirst, Nursing Sister, Q.A.R.N.N.S.
Jennie Holford, Sister, T.F.N.S.
Olive Kathleen Holmes, Nursing Sister, British Red Cross Society
Edith Hounslow, Voluntary Aid Detachment
Amy Howard, Nursing Sister, Canadian Army Nursing Service, Canadian General Hospital, Orpington
Edith Hudson, Nursing Member, Canadian Nursing Service
Ethel Hutchings, Sister, Nursing Service
Florance Hyndman, Acting Sister, Civil Hospital Reserve, Sir Patrick Dun's Hospital, Dublin
Georgina Swinton Jacob, Sister, Q.A.I.M.N.S.
Sybil Ada Catherine Jarvis, Acting Sister, Civil Hospital Reserve, St. Bartholomew's Hospital
Lilian Maud Jeans, Acting Sister, Civil Hospital Reserve, Charing Cross Hospital
Dorothy Jobson, Voluntary Aid Detachment
Isobella Kate Jobson, Staff Nurse, Q.A.I.M.N.S.R., Australia
Nora Johnson, Voluntary Aid Detachment
Sarah Persis Johnson, Nursing Sister, Canadian Army Medical Corps Nursing Service
Mary Ann Jones, Voluntary Aid Detachment
Kate Elizabeth Jones, Matron, Kingston, Surbiton District Red Cross Hospital, New Maiden
Nellie Ida Jordan, Sister, Q.A.I.M.N.S.
Mabel Kaberry, Acting Matron, Q.A.I.M.N.S.
Alicia Mary Kelly, Sister, Australian Army Nursing Service
Evelyn Stewart Killery, Sister, Q.A.I.M.N.S.
Charlotte Grace Kirkpatrick, Sister, T.F.N.S.
Annie Knox, Sister, T.F.N.S.
Jean Knox, Sister, Q.A.I.M.N.S.R.
Helen Lamb, Staff Nurse, T.F.N.S.
Anne Ardagh Langley, Acting Sister, Q.A.I.M.N.S.R.
Harriet Lascell, Matron, Kasr-el-Aine Hospital
The Hon. Margaret Cecilia Lawley, Voluntary Aid Detachment
The Hon. Ursula Mary Lawley, Voluntary Aid Detachment
Lorna Priscilla Leatham, Voluntary Aid Detachment
Annie Norrish Lee, Staff Nurse, Q.A.I.M.N.S.R.
Mary Anderson Linton, Staff Nurse, Civil Hospital Reserve, London Hospital
Constance Little, Voluntary Aid Detachment
Janet McFarlane Livingston, Acting Sister, Q.A.I.M.N.S.R.
Mary Frances Looney, Staff Nurse, New Zealand Army Medical Corps Nursing Service
Daisy Lynch, Acting Sister, Civil Hospital Reserve, Leicester Royal County Hospital
Edith Macarthy, Voluntary Aid Detachment
Ella Marie Louise MacFadden, Sister, Q.A.I.M.N.S.R.
Nellie Mackenzie, Sister, Q.A.I.M.N.S.R.
Annie Forguil Macleod, Staff Nurse, Q.A.I.M.N.S.R.
Jean Mair, Acting Sister, Q.A.I.M.N.S.R.
Letitia Mary Manley, Acting Sister, Civil Hospital Reserve, Middlesex Hospital
Louise Grace Mannell, Staff Nurse, Q.A.I.M.N.S.R.
Marion S. Marshall, Nursing Sister, Q.A.R.N.N.S.R.
Bertha Martin, Staff Nurse, Q.A.I.M.N.S.R.
Elizabeth Martin, Nursing Sister, Canadian Army Medical Corps
Mary Barbara Martin, Sister, Q.A.I.M.N.S.R.
Esther Chisholme Masterton, Staff Nurse, Civil Hospital Reserve, Glasgow Royal Infirmary
Beatrice Matthews, Staff Nurse, T.F.N.S.
Margaret Ballantyre McBride, Sister, T.F.N.S.
Madeline McCarthy, Voluntary Aid Detachment
Marion McCormick, Sister, Q.A.I.M.N.S.
Margaret McCort, Nursing Sister, Canadian Army Medical Corps
Mary Scott McDonald, Staff Nurse, Q.A.I.M.N.S.R.
Susannah Josephine McGann, Staff Nurse, New Zealand Army Nursing Service
Jessie McGillivray, Sister, Q.A.I.M.N.S.R.
Mary S. McHugh, Acting Sister, Q.A.I.M.N.S.R.
Caroline Amelia McIlrath, Staff Nurse, Q.A.I.M.N.S.R.
Florence McKellar, Staff Nurse, T.F.N.S.
Joan Davina Carstairs McPherson, Sister, Q.A.I.M.N.S.
Margaret Meikle, Matron, Cadland Auxiliary Hospital, New Forest, Hampshire
Ebba Wendell de Merrall, Nursing Sister, Canadian Army Nursing Service, Canadian General Hospital, Taplow
Mary Merrill, Voluntary Aid Detachment
Agnes Midgley, Matron, British Red Cross Society
Janet Mitchell, Staff Nurse, T.F.N.S.
Kate Mildred Moore, Matron, Headquarters, London
Grace Morgan, Matron, Arrowe Hall Hospital, Woodchurch, near Birkenhead
Gertrude Daisy Morris, Acting Matron, Q.A.I.M.N.S. (retired)
Martha Reid Morrison, Sister, T.F.N.S.
Helena Morrough, Sister, T.F.N.S.
Elizabeth Mosey, Sister, Australian Army Nursing Service
Ellen Murray, Acting Sister, Q.A.I.M.N.S.R.
Anne Elizabeth Musson, Sister, T.F.N.S.
Amy Augusta Neville, Voluntary Aid Detachment
Dorothy Jane Louisa Newton, Sister, Australian Army Nursing Service
Elizabeth Scott Newton, Acting Sister, Civil Hospital Reserve, Leith General Hospital
Eliza Jane Nicol, Sister, T.F.N.S.
Helena Nisbett, Voluntary Aid Detachment
Millicent Mary Nix, Nurse, The Princess Christian Hospital, Weymouth
Adeline Annie Pallot, Nursing Sister, Nyasaland Nursing Service
Janet Parry, Sister, T.F.N.S.
Violetta Chancha Paschah, Sister, Q.A.I.M.N.S. (retired)
Marian Paterson, Acting Sister, Civil Hospital Reserve, St. Bartholomew's
Margaret Brand Paterson, Nursing Sister, Q.A.R.N.N.S.
Mary Paul, Sister, T.F.N.S.
Edith Payne, Voluntary Aid Detachment
Geraldine Platt, Voluntary Aid Detachment
Sophie Eleanor Pollard, Lady Superintendent, Auxiliary Military Hospital, Thirsk
Mary Pool, Sister, T.F.N.S. 
Edith Mary Porter, Assistant Matron, T.F.N.S.
Mary Potts, Acting Matron, Q.A.I.M.N.S.R.
Florence Catharine Puddicombe, Acting Sister, Q.A.I.M.N.S.R.
Elsie Evelyn Quilter, Acting Sister, Civil Hospital Reserve, Guy's Hospital
Annie Mary Raine, Sister, T.F.N.S.
Katharine Rapson, Matron, St. George's Hill Auxiliary Hospital, Surrey
Ethel Reade, Sister, South African Medical Nursing Service 
Anne Victoria Reay, Acting Sister, Q.A.I.M.N.S.R., Australia
Helena Kate Repton, Matron, British Red Cross Society
Maud Reynolds-Knight, Acting Sister, Civil Hospital Reserve, Westminster Hospital
Kate Ianthe Richardson, Acting Sister, Civil Hospital Reserve, Guy's Hospital
Sarah Jane Robley, Nursing Sister, Canadian Army Medical Corps, Nursing Service
Amy Frances Rohde, Voluntary Aid Detachment
Mary Francis Ronaldson, Acting Sister, Civil Hospital Reserve, Nottingham General Hospital
Mary Ellen Ruck, Sister, T.F.N.S.
Margaret Rudland, Sister, British Red Cross Society
Dorothea Rudman, Acting Sister, Civil Hospital Reserve, Manchester Royal Infirmary
Alice Mary Sampson, Acting Matron, T.F.N.S.
Mabel Scholes, Voluntary Aid Detachment
Elizabeth Sear, Staff Nurse, Q.A.I.M.N.S.R.
Margaret Ion Pierson, Special Probationers Nursing Service
Jeanie Fitzpatrick (Nursing Services), Dublin
Ethel L. Shute (Sister Ignatius), Matron, St. Andrew's Hospital, Dollis Hill, London
Lilian Sidebotham, Sister, T.F.N.S.
Mary Simon, Matron, Wykeham Abbey Auxiliary Military Hospital, York
Angela Ford Sister, Nursing Service
Mary Skinner, Voluntary Aid Detachment
Dorothy Carmynow Sloggett, Voluntary Aid Detachment
Ann Smith, Sister, T.F.N.S.
Dora Shanklie Smith, Sister, Q.A.I.M.N.S.R.
Ethel Smith, Sister, Q.A.I.M.N.S.R.
Mabel Basden Smith, Nursing Sister, Q.A.R.N.N.S.
Elizabeth Smith, Sister, Camberley Auxiliary Military Hospital
Ethel Margaret Spicer, Acting Sister Civil Hospital Reserve, London Hospital
Hilda Frances Starbuck, Acting Sister, Q.A.I.M.N.S.R.
Ethel Fowler Stephenson, Sister, Q.A.I.M.N.S.
Ellenor Stevenson, Matron, Auxiliary Hospital, Henley-in-Arden, Warwick
Mary Ramsay Stewart-Richardson, Acting Sister, Q.A.I.M.N.S.R.
Annie Maud Stirling, Nursing Sister, Canadian Army Medical Corps
Emma Jane Stokes, Sister, T.F.N.S.
Isabella Lyle Storar, Sister, T.F.N.S.
Aileen Yvonne Swann, Voluntary Aid Detachment
Dorothy Maud Sweet, Voluntary Aid Detachment
Matilda Goodall Tate, Staff Nurse, Q.A.I.M.N.S.R.
Lavinia Taylor, Sister, T.F.N.S.
Sophie Isabel Thomson, Sister, T.F.N.S.
Jean Todd, Sister, Q.A.I.M.N.S.
Constance Robina Townend, Assistant Matron, Q.A.I.M.N.S.
Lucy Mary Trumble, Staff Nurse, New Zealand Army Nursing Service
Sadie Tyler, Acting Sister, Q.A.I.M.N.S.
Ethel Frances Upton, Nursing Sister, Canadian Army Medical Corps
Mabel Vivian, Matron, The Princess Christian Hospital, Weymouth
Ellen Constance Wadling, Acting Sister, Civil Hospital Reserve, St. Thomas's Hospital
Agnes Walker, Sister, T.F.N.S.
Ann Wilson Wallace, Nursing Sister, South African Medical Nursing Service 
Dorothy Ward, Sister, T.F.N.S.
Phyllis Mary Waterland, Assistant Matron, British Red Cross Society
Amy Waterman, Acting Sister, Civil Hospital Reserve, Middlesex Hospital
Ethel Frances Watkins, Acting Sister, Q.A.I.M.N.S.R.
Agnes Colthart Watson, Sister, T.F.N.S.
Helena Hendrina Weise, Sister, South African Medical Nursing Service 
Jean Wells, Acting Sister, Q.A.I.M.N.S.R.
Gertrude Whitehurst, Voluntary Aid Detachment
Cicely Wicksteed, Voluntary Aid Detachment
Clarice Malvenie Williams, Sister, Q.A.I.M.N.S.
Margaret Williams, Sister, T.F.N.S.
Edith Mary Williams, Matron, Red Cross Hospital, Brecon, South Wales
Ida Grace Willis, Assistant Matron, New Zealand Army Nursing Service
Annie Paterson Wilson, Acting Sister, Q.A.I.M.N.S.
Isabella Wilson, Sister, Q.A.I.M.N.S.R.
Eleanor Miriam Woodhouse, Sister, T.F.N.S.
Mary Gertrude Woodrow, Matron, Caenshill Auxiliary Hospital, Weybridge
Elizabeth Ann Woodward, Sister, Q.A.I.M.N.S. (T)
Violet Isobel Wotton, Voluntary Aid Detachment
Elizabeth Young-Scott, Voluntary Aid Detachment

Awarded a Bar to the Royal Red Cross (RRC*)

Ethel Hope Becher  Matron-in-Chief, Q.A.I.M.N.S.
Sidney Jane Brown  Matron-in-Chief, T.F.N.S. (Retired, Q.A.I.M.N.S.)
Jane Hoadley  Matron, Q.A.I.M.N.S.
Beatrice Isabel Jones  Matron, Q.A.I.M.N.S.
Emma Maud McCarthy  Matron-in-Chief, Q.A.I.M.N.S.
Sarah Elizabeth Oram  Principal Matron, Q.A.I.M.N.S.
Anne Beadsmore Smith  Principal Matron, Q.A.I.M.N.S.
Mary Wilson  Principal Matron, Q.A.I.M.N.S.

Medal of the Order of the British EmpireFor services in connection with the War in which great courage or self-sacrifice has been displayed.''

Robert Adair. For courage in continuing to work his engine while molten metal was falling round him.
Mary Adams. For courage in assisting others, at great personal risk, in a fire. 
Charles Alford. For courage in removing a large quantity of high explosives during a fire.
Arthur Ernest Allen. For courage in rescuing a fellow-worker at great personal risk.
Arthur Joseph Allen. For courage and resource in assisting to extinguish a fire at an explosives factory at great personal risk.
James Andrew. For courage in remaining at his work during a fire which resulted in a very serious explosion.
John Andrewartha, Fitter, Devonport Dockyard. For courage on the occasion of the trials of a submarine. 
Edwin Bolwell Andrews. For courage in extinguishing a fire in chemical works under circumstances of grave personal danger.
John Edward Andrews. For courage in keeping up steam immediately after an explosion when another explosion seemed imminent.
Charles Armes, Cable Foreman, General Post Office. Employed on cable ships and small craft in connection with war work in dangerous waters. 
F. W. Assirati, Postman. Devotion to duty under specially difficult and dangerous circumstances.
Jesse Attrill, Boatswain, For coolness and resource in averting a serious accident to one of H.M. Ships. 
Ethel Alice Auger. For courage and high example in remaining at her post on a tram, and thus preventing severe casualties to fellow-workers. In doing so she was severely injured. 
Sidney Aylward. For courage and resource in subduing a fire at imminent personal risk.
George Badger. For courage and self-sacrifice in attempting to save life, in spite of severe personal injuries. 
George William Badsey. For courage in fighting, at very great personal risk, a fire caused by an explosion. 
John Baillie, Chargeman of Engine Fitter, Northern Base. For courage and perseverance in carrying out work involving much exposure and risk. 
George Baird. For courage in saving a child from drowning at the works and returning at once to his work.
Daniel Ball. For courage in having several times effected temporary repairs to important plant in an explosives factory at considerable risk to his life.
George Charles Bannister, For great courage in clearing a man-hole at great personal risk.
John Thomas Barber, Carpenter, General Post Office. Employed on cable ships and small craft in connection with war work in dangerous waters. 
Henry Barnard. For courage in fighting a fire at great personal risk while many bags of explosives were being removed.
Thomas Henry Bashford, For great courage on two occasions, entering a tank to recover a fellow-workman who was gassed, and entering a tar still heater. 
Robert Baxter. For courage and resource in saving the life of a fellow-worker at great personal risk.
Beatrice Oxley Beaufort. For courage and high example in continuing to do very dangerous experimental work in spite of injuries received in consequence.
Fanny Elizabeth Beaumont, Sorting Clerk and Telegraphist. Displayed great courage and devotion to duty during air-raids.
John Finnis Beer, Cable Hand. Employed on cable ships and small craft in connection with war work in dangerous waters.
Thomas Bond Bellis. For courage and resource in assisting, at great personal risk, to extinguish a fire at an explosives factory. 
Samuel Hall Bennett. For courage in returning to work within an hour of breaking his thumb whilst at work at age 69.
Myra Grace Bessent, Telephonist. Displayed great courage and devotion to duty during air-raids.
Sydney Rome Black, Assistant Draughtsman. For courage on the occasion of the trials of a submarine. 
James Elias Bloomfield. For courage in extricating living and dead from ruined buildings under circumstances of great danger.
Emmanuel Bloxam, For great courage displayed on the occasion of a serious explosion, when he assisted in extinguishing a fire and saved the life of a fellow-worker at very great personal danger. 
Robert Leach Boal. For courage in keeping down a fire in an explosives factory.
Edward Bond. For courage in closing a main valve on a steam boiler at great personal risk of scalding and suffocation.
Francis Booker, Leading Man, Works Dept., Portsmouth Dockyard, For perseverance in carrying out certain difficult works in the face of grave risks due to bad weather. 
John Booth. For courage in extinguishing a fire on two occasions at very great personal risk.
Lilian Ada Bostock, Telephonist. Displayed great courage and devotion to duty during air-raids.
Arthur Bradbury. For courage in dealing with fires in an explosives factory and remaining at work in a poisonous atmosphere in order to ensure the safety of plant.
George Arthur Bradbury. For courage in assisting to extinguish a fire in an explosives factory at great personal risk.
Martha Bramhall. For courage in remaining continuously afc a very dangerous task in spite of the occurrence of several explosions.
J. H. Brelsford. For courage in assisting, though severely injured, to rescue fellow-workers and to extinguish a fire which resulted in a very serious explosion. 
Amelia Brisley. For courage and high example in cases of explosion in a factory.
Emily Brooke, For great courage shown at an outbreak of fire in an explosives factory.
Andrew Brown, For conspicuous courage in stopping a fire and giving the alarm, under circumstances of the gravest personal danger, after he had been injured by the explosion and rendered unconscious. 
Edwin Brown. For courage in extinguishing a fire after an explosion in which he lost the sight of an eye, and enabling 600 of his fellow-workers to get clear. 
Ethel Brown. For courage on the occasion of a fire in an explosives factory.
Harry Brown. For courage in working continuously under circumstances of very great danger. 
Mary Brown. For courage and high example in getting work started again under circumstances of considerable danger.
William Bryant. For courage in preventing further serious explosion in a filling factory, at very great personal risk. 
John Buckley. For courage and self-sacrifice in carrying out dangerous experiments.
Margaret Winifred Burdett-Coutts. For courage in that, after losing a finger and badly lacerating her hand in a circular saw, she went away quietly to have it treated, in. order not to unnerve her fellow workers. 
Marion Burrell, Sorting Clerk and Telegraphist. Displayed great courage and devotion to duty during air-raids.
James Burton, For great courage in rescuing workers from burning explosives shops, at great personal risk. 
Louisa Busby. For courage in returning to work after an accident resulting in loss of right hand and other injuries.
Edith Butler. For courage, resource, and high example. Has saved the lives of at least two workers, and has displayed exceptional skill and courage in several serious accidents. 
Gertrude Elizabeth Butler. For courage and high example in continuing at her work during a fire, under circumstances of great danger. 
George Patrick Campbell, Carpenter, General Post Office. Employed on cable ships and small craft, in connection with war work in dangerous waters. 
Richard Cardo. For courage and resource shown on several occasions under circumstances of great personal danger.
Louisa Margaret Carlton, Supervisor, Telephones. Displayed great courage and devotion to duty during air-raids and bombardment from the sea. 
Samuel Carter. For courage and resource in saving the life of a chemist and three workers who were overcome by fumes in an explosives factory.
Florence Marie Cass, Telephonist. Displayed great courage and devotion to duty while in charge of a telephone exchange during a serious explosion at a neighbouring munition works.
Sydney Chambers, For great courage in rescuing workers from burning explosives shops at great personal risk.
William Frank Chorley. For courage in removing a large quantity of high explosives during a fire.
Annie Clarke. For courage in keeping workers together under circumstances of great danger.
Mabel Eleanor Clarke, Telephonist. Displayed great courage and devotion to duty during air-raids.
Alexander Clelland. For courage and resource under circumstances of great danger.
Gertrude Coles. For courage in returning to work after her hand had been mutilated by an explosion.
John Corder. For courage in fighting a fire caused by an explosion, at very great personal risk. 
Alexander Cornelius. For courage in having, on two occasions, saved a large amount of raw material in an explosives factory at the risk of his life. 
Thomas Cosby, Fitter, Devonport Dockyard. For courage on the occasion of the trials of a new submarine. 
Herbert Luigi Costa. For courage in continuing to work under circumstances of great danger.
Mabel Rosa Cox, Chargewoman, Royal Naval Cordite Factory, For devotion to duty and great presence of mind in averting an explosion when in charge of a guncotton press. 
May Victoria Croucher. For courage and high example on the occasion of a fire at an explosives factory.
Thomas Crutchley. For courage in entering a gas main and saving the lives of two workers who were gassed, at very great personal risk. 
Sophia Cunningham. For courage and high example in continuing her duties immediately after a severe explosion.
John Cuskearn. For courage in making a determined attempt to recover a valuable instrument from the cooling pond, in consequence of which he contracted blood poisoning and nearly died. 
Lucie Jane Dartnell, Sorting Clerk and Telegraphist. Displayed great courage and devotion to duty during air-raids.
James Davidson, Bricklayer's Labourer. For courage in rescuing a fellow-workman who had been overcome by gas inside a gas apparatus. 
Ben Davies. For courage and high example in remaining at work for an hour after being painfully burnt on his hands, face and neck, and returning to duty for another five hours immediately after treatment. 
James Henry Davies, Skilled Workman, General Post Office. Showed habitual courage in carrying out repairs to submarine cables in difficult and dangerous waters. 
Robert John Davies, Electrical Fitter, Devonport Dockyard. For courage and self-sacrifice on the occasion of an explosion on a submarine boat, on which he was at work. 
Violet Annie Davies. For courage in remaining at her post at the telephone during a severe explosion. Age 15.
William Dixon. For courage in rescuing a fellow-worker at great personal risk.
Joseph Doran. For courage and resource in preventing a fire in an explosives factory, under exceptionally dangerous circumstances.
James Downie, Engine Fitter. For courage and prompt action in helping to extinguish fires which had broken out in the stokeholds of two patrol vessels fitting out. 
John Duff. For courage in preventing a serious explosion under circumstances of great danger.
James Duffy. For courage in attempting to stop a fire in an explosives factory under exceptionally dangerous circumstances.
Peter Dunbabin. For courage and self-sacrifice in carrying out dangerous experiments.
Lucien Duncombe. For courage in removing a large quantity of high explosives during a fire.
Albun Dunn. For courage in saving the life of a fellow worker after an explosion, and giving the alarm, although himself injured by an explosion. 
Bertha Annie Florence Easter, Telephonist. Displayed great courage and devotion to duty during air-raids.
Nicholas Edghill. For courage in helping to subdue fire at great personal risk.
Mabel Ann Edwards. For courage and high example on the occasion of a fire at an explosives factory.
Nora Egan, For great courage shown at an outbreak of fire in an explosives factory.
Henry Etheridge, Skilled Workman, General Post Office. Employed on cable ships and small craft in connection with war work in dangerous waters. 
Frank Cyril Evans, For self-sacrifice in continuing to work, though blind in one eye and the other affected, caused by an accident at work, and in spite of constant pain. 
Fred Evans. For courage and self-sacrifice in carrying out dangerous experiments.
James Evans. For courage and self-sacrifice in carrying out dangerous experiments.
May Evans. For courage in assisting to stop a fire in an explosives factory at considerable danger to her life.
Francis Fagan, Special Constable, For rescuing a drowning man from Holyhead Harbour in circumstances of difficulty and danger. 
Alfred William James Fautley. For courage and resource in stopping a fire in highly inflammable material, at the risk of his life and at the cost of severe injuries. 
Rosa Frances Finbow. For courage in returning to work after serious injury to her face through an explosion. 
Jane Fisher. For courage in assisting to stop a fire in an explosives factory at considerable danger to her life. 
Maude Fisher, For great courage shown at an outbreak of fire in an explosives factory.
Michael Fitzpatrick. For courage in attempting to save part of an explosives factory at great risk of his life.
Bertha Flintoff, Telephonist. Displayed great courage and devotion to duty during an air-raid.
James Harold Foster. For courage in helping to extinguish a fire at cost of serious injuries to himself.
Bernard John Francis. For courage and resource in saving the life of a fellow worker.
Frank Charles Frazer. For courage in preventing an explosion in a filling factory at great personal risk, though partly blinded and suffering considerable pain from explosion. 
William Gilchrist, For self-sacrifice and high example in persisting in work which is often dangerous, though suffering from an incurable disease and often suffering great pain. 
Margaret Annie Louise Godfrey, Telephonist. Displayed great courage and devotion to duty during an air-raid.
Robert William Godfrey, Diver, Admiralty Salvage Section. For courage and devotion to duty in Gallipoli, diving on many occasions when the beaches were being shelled. 
William Gommersall, For several acts of great courage and self-sacrifice.
Edna Goodenough, For continuing to work after suffering serious injuries through an explosion, resulting in loss of right eye. 
James Gosling. For courage in removing a large quantity of high explosives during a fire.
James Grainger. For courage in having, on two occasions, continued at his work in an explosives factory under circumstances of great danger, thereby stopping further damage. 
Frank Wallis Green. For courage and resource in subduing a fire at imminent personal risk.
John Green. For courage and self-sacrifice in dealing with acid and poisonous fumes.
Thomas Edwin Ernest Griffiths. For courage in removing a large quantity of high explosives during a fire.
Frederick Thomas Grigsby. For courage and high example in continuing at his duty during a series of severe explosions.
Frederick Edward Hall. For courage in carrying out very dangerous experiments in a highly-poisonous atmosphere.
James Hamilton. For courage and resource in preventing a fire in an explosives factory under exceptionally dangerous circumstances.
Alice Hanson, For great courage shown at an outbreak of fire in an explosives factory.
James Harley, Assistant Foreman Ironworker. For courage in entering a confined space in a vessel, which was full of noxious fumes, and plugging holes in the structure. 
Elsie Lilian Harman, Supervisor, Telephones. Displayed great courage and devotion to duty during air-raids.
John David Harris
Doris Hirst, Telephonist. For courage in fighting a fire caused by an explosion, at very great personal risk. 
Mary Hartley. For courage and high example: in remaining at her engine and controlling it after having been badly wounded by breakage, of the governor and returning to her work a week later. 
Thomas Havery, Chancery Servant at the British Embassy, Petrograd. Courageous conduct in the discharge of has duties during the revolutionary disturbances in March 1917. 
E. James Hawkins. For courage in preventing an explosion and fire at great personal risk.
William Henry Hayden, For great courage at very great personal risk on the occasion of several fires in a filling factory.
Ethel Head. For courage and high example in rescuing fellow workers after an explosion.
Alice Ann Healey, Telephonist. Displayed great courage and devotion to duty during air-raids.
William Heather, Cable Foreman, General Post Office. Employed on cable ships and small craft in connection with war work in dangerous waters. 
William Hemmingsley. For courage and resource in saving the life of a fellow worker.
Harry Hepworth, For great courage shown at an outbreak of fire in an explosion factory.
Gladys Elizabeth Herrington. For courage in volunteering to undertake dangerous work after a fatal accident.
Amos Freke Hesman. For courage in preventing an explosion and fire, at great personal risk. 
William Hewitt. For courage in saving the life of a fellow worker, who was overcome by poisonous fumes, at great personal risk. 
Ethel Nora Elizabeth Hickey, Telephonist. Displayed great courage and devotion to duty during air-raids and on the occasion of a fire.
Thomas Hickey, Skilled Workman, General Post Office. Has displayed great courage while carrying out telegraph work under dangerous conditions. 
William Charles Hicks, Skilled Workman, General Post Office. Has rendered valuable service since the beginning of the war. Has remained at his post absolutely alone day and night, in spite of danger from submarine or other attacks. 
Alfred Higgs. For courage and resource in saving the lives of two of his fellow workers, at great personal risk. 
Frederick Higham, Special Constable. Swam to an airship which had fallen into a river and assisted two of the crew to reach the bank.
Edward Hill, Steel Smelter. For courage and endurance on many occasions. Remained at her post until relieved, on the occasion of a very serious explosion at munition works, notwithstanding the fact that the explosions were almost, continuous, and that the police advised the Ofc.s on duty to leave the building. 
George William Hobbs, Boatswain, General Post Office. Employed on cable ships in connection with war work in dangerous waters. 
Thomas William Hobbs, Chargeman of Engine Fitters, Devonport Dockyard. For courage on the occasion of the trials of a new submarine. 
Frank Hodgkinson. For courage in assisting to extinguish a fire in an explosives factory, at great personal risk. 
George Hogan. For courage and resource in subduing a fire, at imminent personal risk. 
Victoria Irene Holdsworth. For courage and resource in preventing serious injuries to a fellow worker.
Annie Holly. For courage in continuing at work, though suffering from severe injuries to eye, caused by an explosion. 
Janet Holmes. For courage and resource on the occasion of an explosion in a filling factory.
Mrs Holttum. For courage in assisting to save the lives of fellow workers during a fire which resulted in a serious explosion, though sustaining severe injuries herself. 
G. Hulley. For courage in assisting to extinguish a fire, which resulted in a very serious explosion. 
William Hulme. For courage in assisting to extinguish a fire in an explosives factory, at great personal risk. 
Mabel Hunt, Telephonist. Displayed great courage and devotion to duty during an air raid.
Walter William Hunt. For courage in saving the life of a fellow worker.
William Hunt. For courage and resource on two occasions in preventing serious fires. Age 66.
Frederick Innes, For high courage and resource in closing the outlet valve of a collapsed gas-holder, in which the gas was alight. 
Horace Ivin, Skilled Workman, General Post Office. Has done valuable service under dangerous conditions, repairing submarine cables carrying naval and military wires. 
Florence Jackson. For courage displayed during a time of great danger in a filling factory.
William Jackson. For courage and resource in saving the life of a fellow worker at very great risk to himself.
Herbert Janes. For courage in returning to work immediately after his hand had been dressed on account of his losing three fingers in a shearing machine.
Jack Lane Jeffery. For courage connected with production and testing of exceptionally dangerous materials.
Charles William Johnson. For courage and resource shown on several occasions under circumstances of great personal danger.
Charles William James Johnson. For courage in carrying out repairs to plant in explosives factory in the presence of dangerous gases.
Ellen Johnson, Sorting Clerk and Telegraphist. Displayed great courage and devotion to duty during air-raids.
Alfred Frank Jones, For great courage and high example shown on the occasion of a severe ex-plosion in an explosives factory.
John Richard Jones. For courage and resource in assisting to extinguish a fire at an explosives factory at great personal risk.
Maurice Jones, Inspector, Engineering Dept., General Post Office. Has carried out two very dangerous missions, successfully passing through hostile lines at great personal risk. 
Robert Jones. For courage and resource in assisting to extinguish a fire at a filling factory, at imminent risk of serious explosion. 
Thomas Jones. For courage and high example in doing hard work for long hours in spite of his age (79 years).
George Henry Jordan. For courage in fighting a fire caused by an explosion, at very great personal risk. 
John Kane. For courage in saving the lives of several fellow-workers who were buried in the lining of a furnace which they were repairing.
W. A. Keeling. For courage in remaining at his work during a fire which resulted in a very serious explosion.
Mary Keenan. For courage and high example on the work after sustaining severe injury to face and eyes, on account of an explosion. 
Mary Kiaer. For courage and high example on the occasion of a fire at a filling factory.
Herbert John King. For courage in extinguishing a fire in an explosives factory at very great risk to his life.
Rosa Kate Kipling. For courage in returning to her work after seven and a half months serious illness and several operations caused by an explosion.
James Kirby, Ship Fitter, Portsmouth Dockyard, For self-sacrifice in helping to extricate an injured fellow-workman from a place of danger, though he himself was dangerously injured. 
Walter Reginald Knight. For courage in assisting to extinguish a fire in an explosives factory and removing explosives from the burning building.
John Knox. For courage in saving the lives of several fellow-workers who were buried in the lining of a furnace which they were repairing.
Robert Lake, Fitter and Outside Erector. For courage on board a submarine in dangerous circumstances. 
Patrick Lambe, Skilled Workman, General Post Office. Rendered very valuable service in picking up and repairing wires which had been shotdown. 
Charles Henry Lambert, Master Mariner, Examination Service and Rescue Tugs, Dover Dockyard. For courage and skill displayed in towing cargo and other ships out of a minefield after they had been mined. 
Albert Frederick Lane. For courage and high example on the occasion of a fire in an explosives factory.
Philip C. Langridge, Inspector, Engineering Dept., General Post Office. Displayed great courage and devotion to duty during air-raids. 
Michael Lavelle. For courage and self-sacrifice in carrying out dangerous experiments.
Ada Mary Laws, Telephonist. Displayed great courage and devotion to-duty during air-raids.
Ethel Mary Leeds, Telephonist. Displayed great courage and devotion to duty during, air-raids. 
Mabel Lethbridge. For courage and high example shown on the occasion of an accident in a filling factory, causing loss of one leg and severe injuries to the other. 
John James Lewes, Skilled Labourer, Works Dept., Portsmouth Dockyard, For great skill and daring in the performance of difficult and dangerous work in connection with certain works at Portsmouth. 
Frederick John Lewis, Leading Man (Diver), Chatham Dockyard. For courage, skill and resource exhibited in a marked degree.
Alfred Leyland. For courage and self-sacrifice in carrying, out dangerous experiments. 
Albert Lickess, For great courage and high example shown in dealing with a fire at an explosives factory under circumstances of very exceptional danger.
Arthur Lipscombe. For courage in stopping a fire in a powder factory under circumstances of exceptional danger to his life.
Robert Andrew Lockwood, Skilled Workman, General Post Office. Has done exceptional service during rough weather in effecting repairs to submarine cables carrying naval and military wires. 
Tom Oliver Lodder, Skilled Workman, General Post Office. Showed great courage and devotion while in charge of a telegraph station, carrying out his duties under fire. 
Albert James Lowe. For courage in removing a large quantity of high explosives during a fire.
Alice Ludlow. For courage and high example on the occasion of an explosion and prompt return to work.
William Me Alpine. For courage and self-sacrifice in returning to work after losing, three fingers of right, hand owing to an accident and before the wounds were properly healed.
Agnes McCann. For courage and resource in saving the life of a fellow-worker entangled in dangerously running machinery, at great risk to her life. 
James McDonald. For courage in attempting to save the life of a fellow-worker who was gassed in a gas main by entering it at very great personal risk.
James McDonald, Ironwork Erector. For courage in the rescue of fellow workmen who were overcome by gas. 
George McDougall. For courage in saving the lives of several fellow-workers who were buried in the lining of a furnace which they were repairing.
Edward McFarlane. For courage in saving the lives of two of his fellow-workers by entering an ash receiver full of monoxide gas.
James McGhie, Under Foreman Joiner, For bravery at the cost of serious personal injury in saving a half-blind labourer from being run over by a locomotive. 
Michael McGrath. For courage in ascending a furnace under conditions so dangerous that all others had refused to do so.
May Louise Mclntyre. For courage and high example on the occasion of an accident at a filling factory.
John McMaddocks, For great courage on the occasion of a fire in an explosives factory. He brought the drenchers into action, and used his own body to prevent draught fanning the flames in stoves. Male, Albert Herbert. For courage on the occasion of a fire in an explosives factory. 
Daisy Marsh. For courage and resource in utilising emergency fire appliances on the occasion of an explosion at an explosives factory.
Thomas Martin. For courage displayed on two occasions in dealing with an explosion and a fire at works producing highly inflammable liquids under circumstances of exceptional danger.
Mollie Josephine Mason, Munition Worker, Chatham Dockyard. For courage and presence of mind in averting panic among women workers who were occupants of an overturned railway carriage. 
Robert Massey. For courage and self-sacrifice in carrying out dangerous experiments.
John Master. For courage in preventing an explosion and fire at great personal risk.
Edith Blanche Maw, Supervisor, Telephones. Displayed great courage and devotion to duty during air-raids. 
William Alfred Mayall. For courage and high example on the occasion of a fire in an explosives factory.
Edward Medine. For courage in saving the lives of several fellow workers who, were buried in the lining of a furnace which they were repairing. 
Walter Mee. For courage and resource in dealing with a fire at the cost of bodily injury.
James Menzies. For courage and high example on the occasion of a serious explosion.
William Meredith. For courage in saving the life of a fellow workman who had been rendered unconscious by foul gas.
Annie Dyer Merralls, Supervisor, Telephones. Displayed great courage and devotion to duty during air-raids. 
Robert Miller. For courage in saving the life of a fellow worker who was overcome by poisonous fumes, at great personal risk. 
Rose Mills. For courage displayed on the occasion of an explosion, at great personal risk. 
G. Mitchell. For courage in assisting to extinguish a fire which resulted in a very serious explosion.
George Edgar Mitchell. For courage and high, example on several occasions of explosion and fire in a shell filling; factory. 
John Joseph Christopher Monks, Skilled Workman, General Post Office. On many occasions continued his work under fire, displaying great zeal and courage
Margaret Moody, Telephonist. Displayed great courage and devotion to duty during air-raids.
David George Morgan. For courage and high example in picking up and drowning a shell which had become accidentally ignited.
William Morgan. For courage and resource in assisting to extinguish a fire at a filling factory, at imminent risk of serious explosion. 
Nora Morphet. For courage and high example in continuously working long hours in a poisonous atmosphere which habitually affected her health.
Frederick Thomas Morris. For courage on the occasion of a fire in an explosives factory.
Maggie Mulholland. For courage and very high example in her behaviour when in charge of a canteen adjoining a store of explosives which was on fire.
George Myers. For courage and self-sacrifice in carrying out dangerous experiments.
Abraham Naar, Sorter. Devotion to duty under specially difficult and dangerous circumstances.
Thomas Nadin, Engineer of Yard Craft, Sheexness Dockyard. For courage, self-sacrifice and exceptional skill in the salvage of a merchant ship in a minefield. 
Arthur John Neal. For courage in a serious accident due to bursting of crucible of melted metal. Though, severely injured; he kept the others calm and had them attended to first, though they were in less danger. 
Joan Nelson. For courage in continuing to work in an explosives factory, under circumstances of grave danger. 
George William Newson. For courage in fighting a fire caused by an explosion, at very great personal risk. 
Violet Newton. For courage in returning to work after a serious accident in which two workers were killed, and she was severely injured. 
G. R. Norris. For courage in remaining at his wort during a fire which resulted in a very serious explosion, from which he suffered bodily injuries. 
James Joseph O'Callaghan. For courage in extinguishing a fire on the wooden roof of part of a filling factory, under exceptionally dangerous circumstances. O'Keefe, Percy. For courage in assisting to extinguish a fire in an explosives factory, and removing explosives from the turning building. 
Edward Henry Lewis Owen, Cable Hand, General Post Office. Employed on cable ships and small craft in connection with war work in dangerous waters. 
Roland Basset Paine. For courage displayed on the occasion of a severe accident resulting in serious mutilation of his hand. He insisted on returning to his dangerous occupation as soon as bandages were removed.
Nellie Ena Ann Palmer, Telephonist. Displayed great courage and devotion to duty during air-raids.
Charles Parker, Skilled Labourer, Devonport Dockyard, For self-sacrifice and distinguished conduct whilst engaged on salvage operations. 
William Parker. For courage (1) in helping to extinguish a fire in tar works contiguous to filling factory at great personal risk; (2) in attempting to rescue a surveyor and workman gassed in a sewer, at great risk to his life. 
George Parkinson. For courage and resource in preventing a serious explosion at an explosives factory.
Frederick Payne. For courage in dealing with a fire caused by an explosion, under exceptionally dangerous circumstances. 
Agnes Pearson, Telephonist. On the occasion of a very serious explosion at munition works she remained at her post until relieved, notwithstanding the fact that the explosions were almost continuous and that the police advised the Ofc.s on duty to leave the building. 
Georgina Peeters. For courage and resource in saving the life of a fellow-worker by stopping a machine at great risk to herself.
Wilfred Edward Pendray. For courage in recovering the plug of a cock under circumstances of grave.danger.
Mary Pendreigh. For courage and high example on the occasion of an accident at a filling factory.
Frederick William Pepper, For great courage in rescuing workers from burning explosives shops at great personal risk.
Robert Charles Percy, Acting Inspector of Shipwrights (formerly Chargeman), Northern Base, For devotion to duty in effecting repairs under dangerous conditions. 
Agnes Mary Peters, For great courage and high example in continuing to do work of an exceptionally dangerous nature, which finally resulted in an accident, by which she was totally blinded and otherwise injured. 
Daniel Plume. For courage shown on the occasion of an explosion and at several minor fires, at great personal risk. 
Walter Plummer, Skilled Labourer, Portsmouth Dockyard. For courage and perseverance in the performance of his duties during an explosion. 
Walter Poll. For courage and high example in dealing with a serious fire at a gas works.
John Thomas Poole, Master of Yard Craft, Chatham Dockyard, For perseverance and conspicuous skill under conditions of extreme difficulty and danger. 
Henry William John Porter, Skilled Workman, General Post Office. Showed courage and devotion to duty during repeated air-raids. On one occasion he set to work on the restoration of naval circuits while explosions were taking place fifty yards away. 
Ellen Lenora Potter. For courage and resource in extinguishing a fire, at great personal risk. 
James Pound, For self-sacrifice in working long hours in a highly poisonous atmosphere, where he was several times burnt by acid, and at times almost overcome by fumes. 
Harry Price. For courage and self-sacrifice in carrying out dangerous experiments.
William Henry Price. For courage in attempting to stop a fire in an explosives factory under exceptionally dangerous circumstances. He lost four fingers and practically the use of both hands, while his face was permanently disfigured. 
William Thomas Pugh. For courage on the occasion of a fire in an explosives factory.
Florence Pullen. For courage in continuing to work in spite of serious suffering from an accident caused by an explosion.
Ethel Mary Pullinger, Telephonist. Displayed great courage and devotion to duty during air-raids.
Richard Hayward Purser. For courage and self-sacrifice in working long hours in spite of severe physical disabilities brought about by hardships incurred in the retreat from Mons.
Robert Rae, Coastwatcher, Machrihanish, Kintyre, For rendering valuable assistance to one of H.M. Ships under conditions of great difficulty. 
William H. Rawlin. For courage and high example in saving workers and maintaining order on the occasion of an explosion in a filling factory.
William Dennis Eeardon, Sorter. Devotion to duty under specially difficult and dangerous circumstances.
Albert Edward Reeves. For courage in recovering the plug of a cock under circumstances of grave danger.
Donald Renfrew, Chief Draughtsman, Kelvin, Bottomley & Baird, Ltd. For courage on the occasion of the trials of a submarine.
Robert Roberts. For courage in saving the life of a fellow worker at a fire in an explosives factory, under exceptionally dangerous circumstances. 
George Robinson. For courage and self-sacrifice in carrying out dangerous experiments.
Maggie Rock. For courage and high example on the occasion of an accident at a filling factory.
Charles William Beaver Roll. For courage in attempting to rescue his foreman, by entering an ash receiver full of carbon monoxide gas. 
James Gordon Ross, Skilled Workman, General Post Office. Displayed courage and resource in maintaining telephonic communication during, an air-raid. 
Alfred Rudge. For courage in extinguishing a fire in an explosives factory at very great risk to his life.
Thomas William Rudge, Millwright. For courage and coolness whilst engaged on dangerous work. 
John Ryan, Mate of Yard draft, Haulbowline Dockyard, For his splendid example of pluck and discipline during, salvage operations. 
Thomas Ryan. For courage in removing a large quantity of high explosives during a fire.
Alfred Salenger For courage and self-sacrifice in volunteering for work on dangerous experiments, in the course of which he lost four fingers.
John Frederick Sams. For courage and high example in remaining at his post on a tram, and thus preventing severe casualties to fellow-workers. In doing so he was severely injured. 
Richard Sanders, Engine Fitter, Devonport Dockyard. For courage on the occasion of the trials of a new submarine. 
William Saunders. For courage in attempting to save the lives of workers who were gassed in a gas main, at very great personal risk. 
Edward Scott. For courage in averting a serious accident in a mill, at grave risk to his own life. His arm was badly crushed, and has since had to be amputated. 
Percy Sears. For courage and his example in preventing a fire in an explosives factory, at grave risk to his life. 
Charlie Shaw. For courage and resource in dealing with a fire at an explosives factory, at great personal risk. 
Leonard Short, Engine Fitter, Portsmouth Dockyard. For courage and self-sacrifice during salvage operations. 
Lawrence Simpson. For courage in extinguishing a fire on two occasions, at very great personal risk. 
Sydney Simpson, Skilled Workman, General Post Office. Showed great courage as well as resource on the occasion of a very severe explosion at adjoining munition works. He sent away to a safe place the women operators, and himself maintained uninterrupted telephonic communication. 
William Sinclair. For courage in rescuing a driver who was underneath a railway engine which had begun to move.
Harry Skinner. For courage and resource (1) in extinguishing a fire in a filling factory at imminent risk of serious explosion, (2) in rescuing two fellow-workers gassed in a sewer, at very great personal risk. 
Laurence Skinner. For courage in attempting to stop a fire in an explosives factory under exceptionally dangerous circumstances.
Frank Slater, For great courage shown during a fire in an explosives factory.
Minnie Sleeford, Assistant Supervisor, Telephones. Displayed great courage and devotion to duty during air raids. 
Beatrice Evelyn Smith. For courage in returning to her post at the risk of her life in order to avert danger to the works.
Francis Emily Esther Smith, Supervisor, Telephones. Displayed great courage and devotion to duty during air raids. 
John Smith. For courage in assisting to extinguish a fire in an explosives factory at great personal risk.
Thomas William Fletcher Smith, Tug Master, Dover Dockyard. For courage, initiative and perseverance on salvage operations.
James Snape. For courage and high example in quelling fires during an explosion at great personal risk.
William Snead. For courage in entering a gas main and saving the lives of two workers who were gassed, at very great personal risk. 
Sidney Charles Soley. For courage and resource in dealing with a hand grenade about to explode, whereby he saved several lives. 
Hannah Spash. For courage and high example in continuing her work in a filling factory, after having been on three separate occasions injured by explosions. 
Edward Spencer. For courage and high example in continuing at work in an explosives factory under circumstances of grave danger.
Sidney Arthur Stammers, Cable Hand, General Post Office. Employed on cable ships and small craft in connection with war work in dangerous waters. 
Lily Stanyon. For courage and resource in saving the life of a crane driver at considerable risk to herself.
Edith Steed. For courage and high example in volunteering immediately after a fatal accident to undertake the more dangerous work in the Dept. concerned.
Florence Eliza Steggel, Telephonist. Displayed great courage and devotion to duty during air raids.
Fanny Eleanor Steward, Assistant Supervisor, Telephones. Displayed great courage and devotion to duty during air raids. 
John Stewart. For courage in remaining at work and seeing his job through after being severely shaken by an explosion at an explosives factory.
George William Stocks, Leading Cable Hand. Employed on cable ships and small craft in connection with war work in dangerous waters.
Walter Stokes. For courage in attempting to save the lives of two workers who were gassed in a gas main by entering it at very great personal risk.
William Leverington Stokes. For courage in volunteering to extinguish a fire at cost of serious injuries.
George Robert Stone, Master of Yard Craft, Sheerness Dockyard. For courage, self-sacrifice and exception, all in skill in the salvage of a merchant ship in a minefield. 
Maggie Storey. For courage and high example in extinguishing a dangerous fire at an explosives factory under exceptionally risky circumstances.
Ernest Stubley. For courage in remaining at his post in circumstances of considerable danger in order to safeguard the works.
Robert Studbohne. For courage and resource in preventing a serious explosion at an explosives factory.
Gilbert George Sutcliffe, Inspector, Engineering Dept., General Post Office. Rendered valuable service in the construction and maintenance of telephones under fire. 
Herbert Sykes. For courage in testing aircraft in spite of severe accidents.
Walter William James Symons, Shipwright Apprentice. For courage and presence of mind in the rescue of a fellow-workman from drowning. 
Samuel William Tabb, Acting Mate of Yard Craft, Devonport Dockyard. For courage and skill in handling his tug in assisting to rescue a torpedoed merchant ship from a dangerous position in heavy weather. 
Joseph Edward Talbot. For courage in continuing to work in a poisonous atmosphere, even though suffering seriously from effects. 
Alfred Tansom, Chargeman of Baggers, Portsmouth Dockyard. For courage and coolness in urgent salvage operations. 
Frederick Francis Taylor. For courage in fighting a fire at great personal risk while many bags of explosives were being removed.
George Terry. For courage in working continuously under circumstances of very great danger.
Charles William Thome, Engineer, For perseverance and devotion to duty in trying circumstances, often attended by considerable danger. 
Samuel George Thorneycroft. For courage on the occasion of a fire in an explosives factory.
Thomas Tickner. For courage and resource in dealing with an outbreak of fire at a filling factory.
William John Tidey. For courage in fighting a fire, caused by an explosion, at very great personal risk. 
Joseph Henry Trask, Special Constable. For courage in rescuing injured men from a burning and collapsed building at great personal risk. 
Walter Trebble, Skilled Labourer, Works Dept., Portsmouth Dockyard, For great skill and daring in the performance of difficult and dangerous work in connection with certain works at Portsmouth. 
William Trotman, Engine Fitter, Devonport Dockyard. For courage on the occasion of the trials of a new submarine. 
Ella Trout, While fishing, accompanied only by a boy of ten, she saw that a steamer had been torpedoed and was sinking. Though fully realising the danger she ran from enemy submarines, she pulled rapidly to the wreck and succeeded in rescuing a drowning sailor. 
Alfred Clifford George Valentine. For courage and resource in dealing with a shell in which the top ring of the fuse had fired.
E. Vass. For courage in stopping a fire in an explosives factory at grave risk to his life.
Edith Emily Venus, Supervisor, Telephones. Displayed great courage and devotion to duty during air raids. 
Robert George Vicary. For courage displayed on the occasion of an explosion. He continued to work, though permanently injured by the accident. 
Mary Walker. For courage in continuing to work in an explosives factory under circumstances of grave danger.
Ernest Wall, For two acts: of courage and self-sacrifice in clearing a choked acid main, and on the occasion of a fire in an explosives factory. 
John M. Wallace, Electrical Fitter. For courage, initiative and devotion to duty in trying circumstances. 
Lilian Blanche Wallace. For courage displayed during a time of great danger in a filling factory.
Amelia Jane Ward, Telephonist. Displayed great courage and devotion to duty during air raids and bombardments from the sea.
Daniel Vincent Ward, Inspector, Engineering Dept., General Post Office. Displayed courage and resource while Controlling Ofc. in a neighbourhood exposed to many bombardments by sea-craft and aeroplanes. 
George Frederick Ward. For courage in shutting off outlet master valve of a gasholder during a fire caused by explosion, at serious personal risk. 
Nellie Ward, Supervisor, Telephones. Displayed great courage and devotion to duty during air raids.
Frances Mary Watson. For courage on the occasion of a serious explosion and assisting a fellow-worker to escape at great personal danger.
Frank Watson. For courage in removing a large quantity of high explosives during a fire.
John Watson. For courage in attempting to rescue his foreman by entering an ash receiver full of carbon monoxide gas.
Ada Watt. For courage in continuing to work in an explosives factory under circumstances of grave danger.
Arthur Webber. For courage and resource in giving valuable assistance on the occasion of an explosion at an explosives factory.
Dorothy Kate West, Telephonist. Displayed great courage and devotion to duty during air raids.
George Whatton. For courage and resource in subduing a fire at imminent personal risk.
Dorothy Florence Whibley, Telephonist. Displayed great courage and devotion to duty during an air raid.
Robert Leonard White. For courage in remaining at his work after being very seriously injured.
Mary Agnes Wilkinson, Telephonist. Rendered invaluable service at a telephone exchange on the occasion of a fire and serious explosion at a munition works close by, proceeding to her post through the danger zone at grave personal risk.
William Williams. For courage and resource in extinguishing a fire under circumstances of exceptional danger.
James Winter, Inspector, Engineering Dept., General Post Office. Rendered special services in repairing wires under very dangerous conditions and was frequently under fire. 
Gertrude Wood, Supervisor, Telephones. Displayed great courage and devotion to duty during air raids. 
Alfred Charles Wright, For great courage in rescuing workers from burning explosives shops at great personal risk.
William Wyatt, Skilled Labourer (Stoker), Sheerness Dockyard, For his self-sacrifice and devotion to duty in a time of danger. 
James You'll. For courage in saving the life of a fellow workman who had been rendered unconscious by foul gas.
Alfred Charles Wright Young. For great courage in rescuing workers from burning explosives shops at great personal risk.

Distinguished Service Order (DSO) 

Vice-Admiral Evelyn Robert le Marchant
Rear-Admiral Reginald Arthur Allenby 
Rear-Admiral Cyril Everard Tower
Rear-Admiral Herbert Arthur Stevenson Fyler  
Wing Cmdr. Peregrine Forbes Morant Fellowes  
Engr. Cmdr. Mark Rundle 
Staff Paymaster Hugh Miller 
Staff Surgeon Henry Cooper 
Lt.-Cmdr. Charles Mahon Redhead  Royal Naval Reserve
Flight Cmdr. Alexander MacDonald Shook  Royal Naval Air Service
Maj. Henry Shafto Adair, Cheshire Reg.
Maj. Henry Rainier Adams, Royal Garrison Arty.
Col. John Ainsworth  Royal Arty. Forces
Rev. Michael Adler, Royal Army Chaplains' Dept.
Maj. Nigel Woodford Aitken  Royal Garrison Arty.
Capt. William Philip Jopp Akerman  Royal Field Arty.
Capt. Edmund Alderson  RAMC
Maj. and Bt. Lt.-Col. Percy Stuart Allan, Gordon Highlanders
Capt. Stanley Guy Allden, Army Service Corps
Lt.-Col. Lewis Arthur Allen, Army Service Corps
Maj. Henry Irving Rodney Allfrey  Somerset Light Inf.
Capt. Arthur Emilius David Anderson  King's Own Scottish Borderers
Maj. Charles Abbot Anderson, Manchester Reg.
Maj. and Bt. Lt.-Col. Cecil Ford Anderson, Royal Engineers
Tmp Capt. John Anderson, RAMC
Capt. Walter Alexander Armitage, York & Lancaster Reg., and Machine Gun Corps
Maj. Bening Mourant Arnold, Royal Garrison Arty.
Maj. Francis Anson Arnold-Foster, Royal Field Arty.
Capt. Kenneth Hugh Lowden Arnott  East Lancashire Reg.
Maj. James Arnold Arrowsmith-Brown, Royal Engineers
Lt.-Col. Sydney William Louis Aschwanden, Royal Field Arty.
Maj. Frederic St. John Atkinson, Horse, Indian Army
Capt. Henry Lancelot Aubrey-Fletcher  Grenadier Guards
Capt. Eric William Fane Aylwin-Foster, Army Service Corps
Lt.-Col. Stafford Charles Babington, Royal Engineers
Maj. Edward Alec Horsman Bailey, Royal Field Arty.
Rev. Charles Frederick Baines  Royal Army Chaplains' Dept.
Maj. Sir Randolf Littlehales Baker  Yeomanry
Tmp Major Robert Cecil Bamford, West Yorkshire Reg.
Capt. Kenneth Barge  Cav., Indian Army
Lt.-Col. Frederic Edward Lloyd Barker, Royal Field Arty.
Maj. Archibald Stonham Barnwell, Royal Field Arty.
Tmp Capt. Robert McGowan Barrington-Ward  General List
Lt.-Col. Netterville Guy Barron, Royal Garrison Arty.
Lt.-Col. Harold Percy Waller Barrow  RAMC
Capt. and Bt. Major Alfred James Napier Bartlett, Oxfordshire & Buckinghamshire Light Inf.
Maj. John Channon Bassett, Royal Garrison Arty.
Capt. Harold Henry Bateman  Royal Engineers
Capt. Austin Graves Bates  Royal Field Arty.
Maj. Cecil Robert Bates  Royal Field Arty.
Maj. Lancelot Richmond Beadon, Army Service Corps
Maj. Robert Longfield Beasley, Gloucestershire Reg.
Capt. Lancelot Edward Becher, Royal Engineers
Lt.-Col. William Thomas Clifford Beckett, North Lancashire Reg.
Tmp Major Charles Thomas Cook Beecroft, Army Service Corps
Capt. Hugh Maurice Bellamy  Lincolnshire Reg.
Tmp Major Robert Benzie, South Wales Borderers
Tmp Lt.-Col. Julian Falvey Beyts, Durham Light Inf.
Maj. Harold Francis Bidder, Royal Sussex Reg., attd. Machine Gun Corps
Capt. and Bt. Major George Travers Biggs, Royal Engineers
Capt. David Anderson Bingham, Liverpool Reg.
Lt.-Col. Alexander Harry Colvin Birch, Royal Arty.
Rev. Richard Bird, Royal Army Chaplains' Dept.
Tmp Capt. Benedict Birkbeck  Coldstream Guards
Capt. Norman Pellew Birley  South Staffordshire Reg.
Lt.-Col. Arthur Birtwistle  Royal Field Arty.
Capt. Charles Gamble Bishop, Royal Engineers
Rev. Harry William Blackburne  Royal Army Chaplains' Dept.
Capt. Frederick St. John Blacker, Rifle Brigade
2nd Lt. Richard Graham Blomfield, Guards, and Royal Flying Corps
Lt.-Col. Herbert Richard Blore, King's Royal Rifle Corps
Maj. George Percy Cosmo Blount, Royal Arty.
Maj. Andrew George Board, South Wales Borderers and Royal Flying Corps
Maj. Edward Leslie Bond, Royal Garrison Arty.
Lt.-Col. Francis Henry Borthwick, Royal Welsh Fusiliers
Capt. Malcolm Berwick, Dragoons
Lt.-Col. and Bt. Col. Francis Wilford Boteler, Royal Arty.
Maj. Raymond Walter Harry Bourchier, Royal Field Arty.
Tmp Major Aubrey Henry Bowden, Machine Gun Corps
Maj. and Bt. Lt.-Col. Lionel Boyd Boyd-Moss  South Staffordshire Reg.
Capt. Charles Roger Cavendish Boyle, Oxfordshire & Buckinghamshire Light Inf.
Capt. Francis Lyndon Bradish, RAMC
Capt. Frederick Hoysted Bradley  RAMC
Capt. Samuel Glenholme Lennox Bradley  London Reg.
Tmp 2nd Lt. Albert Newby Braithwaite  General List
Tmp Lt.-Col. Francis Powell Braithwaite  Royal Engineers
Capt. Douglas Stephenson Branson  York & Lancaster Reg.
Capt. Charles Stuart Brebner  RAMC
Capt. Geoffrey Sydney Brewis, Welsh Reg.
Maj. The Hon. Henry George Orlando Bridgeman  Royal Arty.
Capt. Havard Noel Bridgwater, Norfolk Reg.
Lt.-Col. Edgar William Brighton  Bedfordshire Reg.
Tmp Major Francis Edward Briscoe, Yorkshire Reg.
Tmp Major Dyson Brock-Williams, Welsh Reg.
Maj. Nevile Pattullo Brooke, Leinster Reg.
Lt.-Col. John Brown, 1/4th Battalion Northamptonshire Regiment.
Tmp Major George Edward Allenby Browne  Liverpool Reg.
Capt. Hugh Swinton Browne, Royal Field Arty.
Company Charles William Brownlow, Royal Garrison Arty.
Capt. William Fox Bruce  Royal Engineers
Lt.-Col. Thomas Bruce, Royal Arty.
Capt. and Bt. Lt.-Col. Herbert Bryan  Manchester Reg.
Maj. Leonard Corfield Bucknall, Yeomanry
Tmp Capt. Christopher Victor Bulstrode  RAMC
Maj. Richard Seymour Bunbury, Royal Garrison Arty.
Capt. Harold Burchall, Royal Flying Corps Spec. Reserve
Maj. Hubert George Richard Burges-Short, Somerset Light Inf.
Lt.-Col. Arnold Robinson Burrowes  Royal Irish Fusiliers
Capt. Christopher Bushell, Royal West Surrey Reg.
Maj. and Bt. Lt.-Col. Bernard Arnold Barrington Butler, Royal Field Arty.
Tmp Major The Hon. Robert Thomas Rowley Probyn Butler  Tank Corps
Maj. William Erdeswick Ignatius Butler-Bowdon, Duke of Cornwall's Light Inf.
Lt.-Col. Charles Norman Buzzard, Royal Garrison Arty.
Tmp Capt. Walter Roderick Griffith Bye  General List
Tmp Lt.-Col. The Hon. Antony Schomberg Byng  General List and Royal Flying Corps
Tmp Major Alexander Francis Somerville Caldwell, North Lancashire Reg.
Maj. Felix Call, Royal Irish Reg.
Tmp Lt.-Col. Ewen Allan Cameron, North Lancashire Reg.
Rev. Edward Fitzhardinge Campbell  Royal Army Chaplains' Dept.
Maj. Hector Campbell  Indian Army
Maj. The Hon. Ian Malcolm Campbell, Lovat's Scouts
Maj. William Robert Campion  Royal Sussex Reg.
Lt.-Col. Fernand Gustave Eugene Cannot  Army Service Corps
Maj. Alan Douglas Garden, Royal Engineers, and Royal Flying Corps
Tmp Lt. D'Arcy Vandeleur Garden, Royal Field Arty.
Rev. Douglas Falkland Carey  Royal Army Chaplains' Dept.
Capt. John Charles Denton Carlisle  London Reg.
Tmp Capt. Thomas Hamilton Carlisle, Royal Engineers
Capt. Thomas Carnwath  RAMC
Tmp Major Vincent Henry Cartwright, Royal Marine Arty.
Lt.-Col. Trevor Carus-Wilson, Duke of Cornwall's Light Inf.
Tmp Major Frank Cassels, Royal Sussex Reg.
Capt. Geoffrey Cheetham  Royal Engineers
Maj. Lawrence Chenevix-Trench, Royal Engineers
Maj. William Francis Christian, Royal Garrison Arty.
Capt. Archibald Christie, Royal Arty., and Royal Flying Corps
Maj. Henry Robert Stark Christie, Royal Engineers
Maj. Herbert Nicholls Clark, Royal Field Arty.
Maj. Frederick Arthur Stanley Clarke, London Reg.
Tmp Capt. Denzil Harwood Clarke  Durham Light Inf.
Lt.-Col. Robert Clarke, Army Service Corps
Maj. and Bt. Lt.-Col. Reginald Graham Clarke, Royal West Surrey Reg., and Machine Gun Corps
Tmp Major Gerald Malcolm Clayton, Liverpool Reg.
Maj. Francis Alfred Worship Cobbold, Royal Garrison Arty.
Maj. Herbert Philip Gordon Cochran, Middlesex Reg.
Lt.-Col. Edward Webber Warren Cochrane  RAMC
Maj. Douglas Fanley Colson, Royal Engineers
Maj. Richard Coffey, RAMC
Maj. and Bt. Lt.-Col. Edward Sacheverell d'Ewes Coke  King's Own Scottish Borderers
Maj. Alfred Methven Collard, Duke of Cornwall's Light Inf.
Capt. Richard Hamilton Collier, Royal Flying Corps Spec. Reserve
Maj. Reginald Thomas Collins, RAMC
Tmp Major William Alexander Collins, Army Service Corps
Capt. Henry Gordon Comber, unattd. List
Rev. John Morgan Connor  Royal Army Chaplains' Dept.
Maj. Dudley Cookes, Royal Field Arty.
Rev. James Ogden Coop  Royal Army Chaplains' Dept.
Maj. Frank Sandiford Cooper, Suffolk Reg.
Tmp Lt.-Col. William Coote-Brown, Royal Sussex Reg.
Capt. Edward Roux Littledale Corballis, Royal Dublin Fusiliers, and Royal Flying Corps
Maj. Geoffrey Ronald Codrington, Yeomanry
Capt. and Bt. Major Gordon Philip Lewes Cosens, Dragoons
Maj. Reginald Foulkes Cottrell, Royal Garrison Arty.
Maj. Miles Rafe Ferguson Courage, Royal Arty.
Maj. Robert Blaster Cousens, Royal Arty.
Maj. Arthur James Cowan, Royal Field Arty.
Tmp Major William Henry Coysh, Royal Engineers
Maj. James Craik, Indian Army Lancers
Maj. George Craster, Indian Army Cav.
Maj. and Bt. Lt.-Col. Arthur Julius Craven, Royal Engineers
Tmp Major Edward William Crawford, Royal Inniskilling Fusiliers
Capt. William Loftus Crawford, Lancashire Fusiliers
Rev. Canon Thomas Emerson Crawhall, Royal Army Chaplains' Dept.
Q.M. and Hon. Major Hugh Cressingham, Bedfordshire Reg.
Maj. The Hon. Frederick Heyworth Cripps, Yeomanry
Maj. Sir Morgan George Crofton  Life Guards
Maj. John Frank Crombie, RAMC
Maj. Arthur Edwin Cronshaw, Manchester Reg.
Maj. Bernard Cruddas, Northumberland Fusiliers
Capt. Arthur Ludlam Cruickshank, Royal Garrison Arty.
Tmp Major Bertram Stephen Rowsell Cunningham, Army Service Corps
Capt. Richard Robinson Curling, Royal Arty.
Capt. Hubert Montague Cotton-Curtis, North Staffordshire Reg.
Maj. and Bt. Lt.-Col. Evan Campbell da Costa, East Lancashire Reg.
Tmp Major Thomas William Daniel  Nottinghamshire and Derbyshire Reg.
Capt. Neville Reay Daniell, Duke of Cornwall's Light Inf.
Maj. William Augustus Bampfylde Daniel, Royal Horse Arty.
Capt. Markham David, Monmouthshire Reg., Royal Engineers
Maj. Thomas Jenkins David, Royal Horse Arty.
Maj. Alan Hier Davies, Royal Field Arty.
Tmp Lt.-Col. John Edward Henry Davies, RAMC
Tmp Major Gilbert Davidson, Army Service Corps
Capt. Owen Stanley Davies, Royal Engineers
2nd Lt. Thomas Henry Davies  Royal Engineers
Tmp Major William Hathaway Davis  Machine Gun Corps
Capt. Hugh Frank Dawes  Royal Fusiliers
Capt. Harold John Dear, London Reg.
Capt. Philip de Fonblanque, Royal Engineers
Tmp Major Thomas Lyttleton de Havilland, Royal Scots Fusiliers (Major, South African Def. Force)
Maj. John Nathael de la Perrelle  Royal Fusiliers
Capt. James Finlay Dempster, Manchester Reg.
Tmp Capt. Eustace Charles de Neufville, Royal Garrison Arty.
Capt. and Bt. Major Henry Denison Denison-Pender  Dragoons
Lt. Col. Bertie Coore Dent, Leicestershire Reg., Cheshire Reg.
Maj. John Neston Diggle, Royal Field Arty.
Lt. Francis Ivan Leslie Ditrcaet  Durham Light Inf.
Maj. Peter Doig, Royal Garrison Arty.
Capt. Harry Cecil Dolphin, Hampshire Reg.
Tmp Capt. Frederick Langloh Donkin, Royal Field Arty.
Maj. Alan Sydney Whitehom Dore, Worcestershire Reg., and Royal Flying Corps
Maj. Francis Holland Dorling, Manchester Reg.
Capt. Edward Cecil Doyle, Royal Army Veterinary Corps
Capt. and Bt. Major Reginald John Drake, North Staffordshire Reg.
Maj. Harold Bruce Dresser, Royal Field Arty.
Capt. Cecil Francis Drew, Scottish Rifles
Maj. George Barry Drew, West Yorkshire Reg.
Maj. Horace Robert Bawley Drew, Northamptonshire Reg.
Lt. William Stuart Gordon Drummond, Army Service Corps
Maj. Ralph Duckworth, South Staffordshire Reg.
Maj. Robert Maxwell Dudgeon  Cameron Highlanders
Maj. William Marshall Dugdale, Royal Welsh Fusiliers
Capt. Donald Duncan  Gloucestershire Reg.
Maj. (Temporary Lt. Col.) Horace Adrian Duncan, Argyll and Sutherland Highlanders
Maj. Norman Edwin Dunkerton, RAMC
Capt. Thomas Spence Dunn, Royal Army Medical Service
Maj. Guy Edward Jervoise Durnford, Royal Engineers
Maj. Bernard Alfred Saunders Dyer, Army Service Corps
Maj. and Bt. Lt.-Col. Percyvall Hart Dyke, Baluchis, Indian Army
Maj. Gerald Lang Dymott, Royal Field Arty.
Capt. Bruce Lindsay Eddis, Royal Engineers
Capt. Harold Walter Edwards  Royal Warwickshire Reg.
Tmp Major Richard Prior Ferdinand Edwards, Army Service Corps
Capt. William Egan  RAMC
Capt. Horace Anson Eiloart  London Reg.
Maj. William Gardiner Eley
Capt. Garrard Elgood, Royal West Kent Reg.
Capt. Edward Charles Ellice (retired), Grenadier Guards
Maj. Edward Halhed Hugh Elliot, Royal Field Arty.
Tmp Lt.-Col. Thomas Renton Elliott, RAMC
Capt. Arthur Addison Ellwood  Lincolnshire Reg., attd. Machine Gun Corps
Tmp Lt.-Col. Wilfred Elston  Manchester Reg.
Maj. Sir Francis Napier Elphinstone-Dalrymple  Royal Arty.
2nd Lt. Charles Adrian Ashfoord Elton, Royal Warwickshire Reg.
Maj. Robert Emmet Sr., Yeomanry
Lt.-Gol Cuthbert Evans  Royal Arty.
Capt. William Harry Evans, Royal Engineers
Maj. Alfred Howell Evans-Gwynne, Royal Field Arty.
Capt. Eliott Nial Evelegh  Royal Engineers
Capt. Thomas, Swan Eves  RAMC
Maj. Charles Nicholson. Ewart, Royal Garrison Arty.
Maj. William Turner Ewing, Royal Scots
Tmp Major John Knox Ewart, Army Service Corps
Tmp Major Cresswell John Eyres, Royal Garrison Arty.
Maj. Bernard Joseph Fagan, Inf., Indian Army
Capt. Harold Arthur Thomas Fairbank  RAMC
Lt.-Col. Brereton Fairclough  South Lancashire Reg.
Capt. Arthur Wellesley Falconer  RAMC
Tmp Lt.-Col. Ronald Dundas Falconar-Stewart, Argyll and Sutherland Highlanders
Capt. Arthur Thomas Falwasser, RAMC
Maj. William Alexander Farquhar, Royal Scots Fusiliers
Capt. John Arthur Joseph Farrell, Leinster Reg.
Maj. Paul John Fearon, Royal West Surrey Reg.
Tmp Major Francis Hood Fernie, Tank Corps
Maj. Maurice Christian Festing, Royal Marine Light Inf.
Capt. Linwood Field  Royal Arty.
Maj. Harold Stuart Filsell, Royal Warwickshire Reg.
Maj. John Alexander Findlay, Highland Light Inf.
Maj. Walter Taylor Finlayson, Indian Medical Service
Maj. David Leonard Fisher  RAMC
Maj. James Thackeray Fisher, Royal Engineers
Tmp Major Arthur Stanley Fitzgerald, Royal Warwickshire Reg.
Capt. Edward Herbert Fitzherbert  Army Service Corps
Capt. Terrick Charles Fitzhugh  Royal Irish Reg.
Capt. and Bt. Major Noel Trew Fitzpatrick  Royal Engineers
Lt.-Col. Archibald Nicol Fleming  Indian Medical Service
Lt.-Col. Frank Fleming, Royal Field Arty.
Capt. Percy Beresford Fleming, Army Service Corps
Capt. The Hon. Gerald William Frederick Savile Foljambe, late Oxfordshire & Buckinghamshire Light Inf.
Maj. Richard Mildmay Foot  Royal Inniskilling Fusiliers
Lt. Stephen Henry Foot, Royal Engineers
Maj. Nowell Barnard de Lancey Forth  Manchester Reg.
Tmp Capt. William Nelson Foster, Army Service Corps
Maj. Cecil Fowler, Royal Field Arty.
Tmp Major George Fox, General List
Rev. Henry Watson Fox, Royal Army Chaplains' Dept.
Capt. The Hon. Alastair Thomas Joseph Fraser, Lovat's Scouts (Cameron Highlanders)
Lt. John Alexander Fraser, Dragoon Guards
Lt.-Col. Thomas Fraser  RAMC
Capt. The Hon. William Fraser  Gordon Highlanders
Tmp Major The Hon. Edward Gerald French, General List
Capt. John Roberts Frend, Leinster Reg.
Maj. Charles Gibson Fulton, Royal Field Arty.
Lt.-Col. Willoughby Furnivall, Royal Field Arty.
Maj. William Fleetwood Fuller, Yeomanry
Capt. Edward Keith Byrne Furze  Royal West Surrey Reg.
Maj. Edgar David Galbraith, Indian Army
Maj. Aylmer George Galloway, Army Service Corps
Maj. Robert Leech Galloway, Royal Field Arty.
Maj. Charles Edward Galwey, late Royal Irish Reg.
Capt. William Boss Gardner  RAMC
Maj. William Garforth  Royal Engineers
Maj. John Reginald Garwood, Royal Engineers
Maj. Henry Percy Garwood, Royal Garrison Arty.
Tmp Lt.-Col. Cecil Claud Hugh Orby Gascoigne, Worcestershire Reg.
Capt. Eric Gerald Gauntlett  RAMC
Capt. Cyril Herbert Gay, Royal Arty.
2nd Lt. Frederick George Peter Gedge, Royal Engineers
Capt. William Charles Coleman Gell  Royal Warwickshire Reg.
Capt. Alfred Joseph Gibbs  Royal Field Arty.
Maj. Hugh Edward Gibbs, Royal Army Veterinary Corps
Capt. Alexander John Gibson, RAMC
Capt. Harold Gibson, RAMC
Tmp Major Joseph Gibson, Army Service Corps
Maj. Lewis Gibson, Royal Highlanders
Tmp Major Donald Hope Gibsone, Royal Engineers
Capt. John Galbraith Gill  RAMC
Maj. Reynold Alexander Gillam, Royal Engineers
Lt.-Col. John Gilmour Jr., Royal Highlanders
Tmp Capt. Sydney Elliot Glendenning, Royal Engineers
Lt. Kenneth Bruce Godsell  Royal Engineers
Maj. and Bt. Lt.-Col. Charles Alexander Campbell Godwin, Indian Army Cav.
Maj. George Edward Goldsmith, Army Service Corps
Tmp Lt.-Col. William Richard Goodwin, Royal Irish Rifles
Maj. Alexander Robert Gisborne Gordon, Royal Irish Reg.
Lt.-Col. George Hamilton Gordon, Royal Field Arty.
Maj. Granville Cecil Douglas Gordon, Welsh Guards
Maj. Richard Glegg Gordon, Lowland Royal Garrison Arty.
Maj. William Gordon, Royal Garrison Arty.
Maj. and Bt. Lt.-Col. Lord Esmé Charles Gordon-Lennox  Scots Guards
Capt. and Bt. Major Eric Gore-Browne, London Reg.
Lt.-Col. Michael Derwas Goring-Jones  Durham Light Inf.
Rev. Thomas Sydney Goudge, Royal Army Chaplains' Dept.
2nd Lt. Arthur Ernest Gould  Royal Engineers
Maj. John Maxwell Gover  RAMC
Capt. Malise Graham, Lancers
Maj. Roland Cecil Douglas Graham, Royal Garrison Arty.
Maj. Hubert Francis Grant-Suttie  Royal Arty.
Maj. Bernard Granville, Yeomanry
Lt.-Col. Henry William Grattan, RAMC
Capt. and Bt. Major Stafford Henry Green  West Yorkshire Reg.
Maj. Wilfrith Gerald Key Green, Indian Army
Tmp Major Frederick Harry Greenhough, Royal Engineers
Maj. William Basil Greenwell, Durham Light Inf.
Maj. Charles Francis Hill Greenwood, London Reg.
Tmp Major Richard Hugo Gregg  Royal Fusiliers
Capt. William Thornton Huband Gregg, Royal Irish Fusiliers
Capt. George Pascoe Grenfell, Royal Flying Corps
Rev. John Wesley Elnox Griffin  Royal Army Chaplains' Dept.
Tmp Lt.-Col. Edward Waldegrave Griffith, Royal Arty.
Lt. Edward William Macleay Grigg  Grenadier Guards
Tmp 2nd Lt. Hugh Noel Grimwade  General List
Capt. Ewart Scott Grogan, Unattd. List, East African Forces
Maj. and Bt. Lt.-Col. Herbert Watkins Grubb, Border Reg.
Tmp Major Frederick Henry Wickham Guard, Royal Scots
Lt.-Col. Frederick Gordon Guggisberg  Royal Engineers
Lt. Eric Cecil Guinness, Royal Irish Reg.
Maj. Hamilton Bruce Leverson. Gower Gunn  Royal Garrison Arty.
Capt. Arthur Henry Habgood RAMC
Lt.-Col. Bernard Haigh, Army Service Corps
Wing Cmdr. Frederick Crosby Halahan  Royal Naval Air Service
Tmp Lt.-Col. Frederick Hall  Royal Field Arty.
Lt.-Col. Robert Sydney Hamilton  Army Ordnance Depot
Capt. Denys Huntingford Hammonds  Royal Engineers
Tmp Major Claude Hancock, Gloucestershire Reg.
Maj. John Haig, Yeomanry
Maj. Mortimer Pawson Hancock, Royal Fusiliers
Tmp Capt. William Charles Hand  Royal Garrison Arty.
Maj. and Bt. Lt.-Col. Edward Barnard Hanley, Worcestershire Reg., attd. Tank Corps
Capt. Hubert Arthur Oldfield Hanley, Middlesex Reg.
Lt.-Col. Cathcart Christian Hannay, Dorsetshire Reg.
Capt. Frank Stephen Hanson  Royal Warwickshire Reg.
Tmp Major Cecil Claud Alexander Hardie, Royal Engineers
Tmp Capt. George Richardson Harding, Royal Engineers
Capt. Thomas Hubert Harker, King's Royal Rifle Corps
Capt. Charles Harry Hart  Army Service Corps
Tmp Capt. Owen Hart, Royal Field Arty.
Maj. Charles Darby Harvey, Nottinghamshire and Derbyshire Reg.
Maj. Cosmo George Sinclair Harvey, Royal Field Arty.
Maj. Gardiner Hassell Harvey, Army Service Corps
Capt. and Hon. Major John Harvey (retired)
Capt. Percy Lovell Clare Haslam, Hussars, attd. Tank Corps
Maj. Randal Plunkett Taylor Hawksley, Royal Engineers
Capt. James George Hay, late Gordon Highlanders
Capt. Geoffrey Hayes, Durham Light Inf.
Maj. William Burrell Hayley, Royal Horse Arty.
Tmp Lt.-Col. George William Hayward, Royal Field Arty., Riding Master and Hon. Major (retired)
Lt. Eustace Fellowes Sinclair Hawkins, Army Service Corps
Maj. Thomas Hazelrigg, Army Service Corps
Capt. Cuthbert Morley Headlam, Bedford Yeomanry
Maj. Arthur Basset Hearle, Royal Garrison Arty.
Maj. GeorgeNoah Heath, Cheshire Reg.
Capt. Joseph Thomas Heath  Royal Engineers
Maj. Vincent James Heather, Royal Arty.
Capt. Alfred George Hebblethwaite, RAMC
Maj. Fercival John Beresford Heelas, Royal Field Arty.
Lt.-Col. Harry Dal ton Henderson, Army Service Corps
Lt.-Col. Lionel Lees Hepper, Royal Garrison Arty.
Maj. and Bt. Lt.-Col. William Francis Hessey, Royal Inniskilling Fusiliers
Capt. Charles Caulfield Hewitt  Royal Inniskilling Fusiliers, and Machine Gun Corps
Maj. Gerald Heygate, Royal Field Arty.
Lt.-Col. Sir Graham Percival Heywood  1st Staffordshire Yeomanry
Tmp Lt. Herbert John Hill, Royal Engineers
Maj. Rowland Clement Ridley Hill, Royal Engineers
Maj. Francis Barrett Hills, Royal Garrison Arty.
Lt.-Col. Harry Alexander Hinge  RAMC
Capt. and Temp Major Charles Faunce Hitchins, Royal West Kent Reg.
Col. Reginald Hoare, 4th Hussars
Tmp Major Harry Roy Hobson, Army Service Corps
Capt. Adam Hodgins, Royal Army Veterinary Corps
Lt.-Col. William Holdsworth Holdsworth Hunt, Royal Garrison Arty.
Lt. Henry Arthur Hollond, Royal Garrison Arty.
Tmp Major Francis John Courtenay Hood, York & Lancaster Reg.
Maj. John Charles Hooper, Shropshire Light Inf.
Capt. and Bt. Major Robert Victor Galbraith Horn  Royal Scots Fusiliers
Maj. George John Houghton, RAMC
Lt.-Col. John William Hobart, Houghton  RAMC
Capt. Charles Kenneth Howard-Bury, King's Royal Rifle Corps Spec. Reserve
Lt.-Col. Walter Howell Jones, Royal Garrison Arty.
Q.M. and Hon. Major James Thomas Harold Hudson, Middlesex Reg.
Tmp Capt. Henry Moore Hudspeth  Royal Engineers
Capt. Basil Hughes  RAMC
Maj. Edward William Hughes  London Reg.
Maj. William Hughes  London Reg.
Maj. Henry Horne Hulton, Royal Field Arty.
Maj. Walter Vernon Hume, South Lancashire Reg.
Maj. George Noel Humphreys, Army Service Corps
Maj. Rochford Noel Hunt  RAMC
Maj. Reginald Seager Hunt, Dragoon Guards
Capt. Cecil Stuart Hunter, Royal Arty.
Tmp Major Hugh Blackburn Hunter, Army Service Corps
Maj. Henry Noel Alexander Hunter, Royal West Surrey Reg.
Tmp Lt.-Col. Arthur Reginald Hurst, Royal Field Arty.
Maj. Ralph Hamer Husey  London Reg.
Capt. Colin Ross Marshall Hutchison  Royal Field Arty.
Q.M. and Hon. Major Thomas Charles Ibbs, London Reg.
Lt.-Col. Henry Wilson Iles, Royal Garrison Arty.
Capt. Bernhardt Basil von Brumsy im Thurn  Hampshire Reg.
Maj. Charles Elliott Inglis, Royal Garrison Arty.
Tmp Major Richard Inglis, King's Royal Rifle Corps
Maj. Thomas Stewart Inglis, Royal Field Arty.
Tmp Lt.-Col. Arthur Innes Irons, Middlesex Reg.
Capt. Noel Mackintosh Stuart Irwin  Essex Reg.
Maj. William Rennie Izat, Royal Engineers
Capt. Edward Darby Jackson, King's Own Scottish Borderers
Tmp Major Frank Whitford Jackson, Army Service Corps
Maj. and Bt. Lt.-Col. Herbert William Jackson, Indian Army
Maj. Richard Rolt Brash Jackson, Army Service Corps
Maj. Arthur Lawrence Baldwin Jacob, Royal Garrison Arty.
Tmp Major Archibald Hugh James, Northumberland Fusiliers, West Yorkshire Reg.
Maj. and Bt. Lt.-Col. Ralph Ernest Haweis James  North Lancashire Reg.
Maj. Cyril Jarrett, Middlesex Reg.
Tmp Capt. Arthur Alfred Jayne  Royal Engineers
Maj. Richard Griffith Bassett Jeffreys, Royal Dublin Fusiliers
Maj. Leoline Jenkins  Dorset, Royal Garrison Arty. and Royal Flying Corps
Maj. Sir Walter Kentish William Jenner  late 9th Lancers
Lt.-Col. Arthur Stawell Jenour  Royal Garrison Arty.
Maj. Arthur Baynes Johnson, Lincolnshire Reg.
Lt.-Col. Allen Victor Johnson, Royal Fusiliers, King's Royal Rifle Corps
Tmp Major Benjamin Sandford Johnson, Army Service Corps
Maj. Victor Neville Johnson, Gloucestershire Reg.
Tmp Lt.-Col. Frederick Campbell Johnston, Royal Arty.
Maj. George Bernard Johnson, Royal Field Arty.
Tmp Lt.-Col. William Hamilton Hall Johnston  Middlesex Reg.
Maj. Harry Haweis Joll  Royal Arty.
Maj. Archibald Nelson Gavin Jones, Indian Army
Lt.-Col. John Josselyn, Suffolk Reg.
Capt. Edward James Kavanagh  RAMC
Maj. Thomas Kay  RAMC
Maj. Gerard Ainslie Kompthorne, RAMC
Capt. and Bt. Major Edward Holt Kendrick, Royal Dublin Fusiliers
Maj. William Kennedy, East African Veterinary Corps
Lt. Albert Edmund Kent  Leicestershire Reg.
Maj. John Kent, Royal Field Arty.
Maj. Herbert Edward Kenyon, Royal Garrison Arty.
Tmp Major John Victor Kershaw, East Lancashire Reg.
Maj. Sidney Hardinge Kershaw, Northumberland Fusiliers
Lt. Francis Percy Kindell  Royal Arty.
Maj. Charles Harold Kilner, Royal Field Arty.
Maj. Robert Edgar Kilvert, Royal Marine Arty.
Tmp Capt. Charles Francis King  Cheshire Reg.
Capt. Frank King, 4th Hussars
Tmp Major John Bussell King, Army Service Corps
Tmp Major Wentworth Alexander King-Harman (retired) List, late Royal Irish Rifles
Maj. Guy Thornhill Kingsford, Royal Engineers
Capt. John Lawson Kinnear  Liverpool Reg. and Royal Flying Corps
Tmp Lt.-Col. Lewis Hawker Kirkness, Special List
Maj. Harry Fearnley Kirkpatrick, East Kent Reg.
Tmp Major Leonard Knapman, Army Service Corps
Maj. Charles Leycester Knyvett  Royal Field Arty.
Tmp Lt.-Col. Robert Kyle, Highland Light Inf.
Maj. Wilham Frederick Robert Kyngdon, Royal Garrison Arty.
Maj. Roderick Laing  Seaforth Highlanders
Maj. James Laird, Royal Field Arty.
Capt. Ronald Dewe Lake, Northamptonshire Reg.
Tmp Major George Moorsom Lagier Lamotte, Royal Engineers
Capt. John du Plessis Langrishe  RAMC
Maj. John Henry Langton, Royal Welsh Fusiliers
Maj. Percy Edward Langworthy Parry, London Reg.
Maj. Sir Thomas Perceval Larcom  Royal Arty.
Capt. Stanley Dermott Large  RAMC
Capt. The Hon. Edward Cecil Lascelles  Rifles Brigade
Mag Charles Trevor Lawrence, Royal Field Arty.
Maj. Geoffrey Lawrence, Royal Field Arty.
Maj. Hervey Major Lawrence, Scottish Rifles
Capt. Arthur Bertram Layton, South Lancashire Reg.
Tmp Major Ralph le Butt, Machine Gun Corps
Capt. Victor Carmichael Leckie, Royal Army Veterinary Corps
Maj. Guy Lee  East Kent Reg.
Capt. George Maconchy Lee  Royal Fusiliers
Maj. Harry Romer Lee, 20th Hussars
Maj. Edward Frederick William Lees, Royal Engineers
Maj. Alexander Leggat  RAMC
Capt. Charles Edward Lembcke, Northumberland Fusiliers
Maj. Frederick Joseph Lemon, West Yorkshire Reg.
Tmp Major Dudley Lewis  York & Lancaster Reg.
Lt.-Col. Philip Edward Lewis, Royal Arty.
Capt. Wilfrid Gordon Lindsell  Royal Arty.
Capt. Christopher George Ling  Royal Engineers
Maj. Harold Cronshaw Lings, Manchester Reg.
Tmp Lt. The Hon. Charles Christopher Josceline Littleton, Middlesex Reg.
Lt. William Howard Livens  Royal Engineers
Maj. Evan Henry Llewellyn, King's African Rifles
Maj. Evan Colclough Lloyd, Royal Irish Reg.
Lt. Ormond Maxwell Loggie  Royal Garrison Arty.
Tmp Capt. Kenneth Thurston Lomas, Royal Engineers
Maj. Thomas Longbottom, West Yorkshire Reg.
Capt. and Bt. Lt.-Col. Charles Alexander Holcombe Longcroft, Welsh Reg.
Capt. Henry Kerr Longman  late Gordon Highlanders
Lt.-Col. William Loring, Royal Garrison Arty.
2nd Lt. Stuart Gilkinson Love 
Maj. John Gordon Lowndes, late North Lancashire Reg.
Capt. Henry Charles Loyd  Coldstream Guards
Tmp Major Lowes Dalbiac Luard, Army Service Corps
Maj. Williams Ludgate, Royal Army Veterinary Corps
Capt. and Bt. Major Edgar Rainey Ludlow-Hewitt  Royal Irish Rifles
Maj. Cecil St. John Lynch, Royal Engineers
Capt. Jasper Beverley Lynch, late 12th Cav., Indian Army
Local Major Frank Sanderson Lyster, Special List
Maj. Archibald Laird MacConnell, Argyll and Sutherland Highlanders
Capt. Harold Symes MacDonald  Royal Field Arty.
Tmp Major James Leslie Auld Macdonald, Royal Scots
Lt.-Col. Reginald James Macdonald, Royal Garrison Arty.
Maj. John Buchanan MacFarlan, Royal Field Arty.
Lt. Fane Andrew James Macfarlane, London Reg.
Maj. Walter Macfarlane, Glasgow Yeomanry
Capt. Fraoicis Burnett Mackenzie  Royal Scots
Maj. Pierse Joseph Mackesy  Royal Engineers
Capt. and Bt. Major William Alexander Onslow Churchill Mackintosh, Royal Arty.
Maj. and Bt. Lt.-Col. Charles Alexander Hugh MacLean, Argyll and Sutherland Highlanders
Maj. Charles Wilberforce MacLean, Cameron Highlanders
Tmp Major Adam Gordon MacLeod, Army Service Corps
Capt. Donald Macleod  North Staffordshire Reg.
Maj. Malcolm Neynoe MacLeod  Royal Engineers
Lt. Mind en Whyte Melville MacLeod, Royal Garrison Arty.
Capt. and Bt. Major Patrick Dalmahoy McCandlish, Argyll and Sutherland Highlanders
Maj. William McCall  RAMC
Maj. Robert Singleton McClintock, Royal Engineers
Tmp Capt. Ivor Herbert McClure, Intelligence Corps
Lt. Hamilton McCombie  Worcestershire Reg.
Capt. William McKim Herbert McCullagh  RAMC
Capt. and Bt. Major James Innis Aikin McDiarmid, Royal Garrison Arty.
Tmp Capt. Gordon Archibald McLarty  RAMC
Maj. Norman Macdonald McLeod  Royal Field Arty.
Capt. Hugh McMaster  Royal Arty.
Capt. Donald Jay McMullen, Royal Engineers
Capt. John William McNee  RAMC
Tmp Capt. George Maitland Edwards, Royal Engineers
Lt.-Col. George Alexander Malcolm, Reserve, attd. London Reg.
Tmp Capt. Stuart Sydney Mallinson  Royal Engineers
Capt. John Alexander Manifold  RAMC
Capt. Lionel Manton, Royal Engineers
Maj. and Bt. Lt.-Col. Arthur Henry Marindin, Royal Highlanders
Maj. and Bt. Lt.-Col. Cecil Colvile Marindin, Royal Garrison Arty.
Capt. Bryan Lister Marrmer, Royal Field Arty.
Capt. John Francis Harnsor Marsh, Hampshire Reg.
Capt. Alfred Russel Marshall  Royal Engineers
Capt. Charles Frederick Kelk Marshall  Royal Field Arty.
Hon. Major Henry Alfred Marshall, Army Ordnance Depot
Tmp Major Ernest Brasewhite Martin, Royal Engineers
Maj. Daniel Johnstone Mason, Royal Field Arty.
Maj. Malcolm Forty Mason, Suffolk Reg.
Capt. Charles Walter Massy  Royal Field Arty.
Maj. Reginald Cosway Matthews, Royal Army Veterinary Corps
Tmp Lt.-Col. William Riddell Matthews, RAMC
Lt. Hugh Patrick Guarm Maule  Honourable Arty. Company
Maj. William John Maule, Essex Reg.
Lt.-Col. Herbert Blair Mayne, Royal Garrison Arty.
Capt. John Maxwell  Rifle Brigade
Lt.-Col. James McCall Maxwell  Royal Field Arty.
Tmp Lt.-Col. Robert David Perceval-Maxwell, Royal Irish Rifles
Maj. Sydmey Manvers Woolner Meadows, RAMC
Maj. Cyril Frankland Meares, Royal Irish Fusiliers
Maj. Teignmouth Philip Melvil, Lancers
Tmp Major David Kinloch Michie, Highland Light Inf.
Capt. George Waterston Miller, RAMC
Maj. Hubert Garrett Blair Miller  Royal Scots Fusiliers
Rev. William Herbert Latimer Miller  Royal Army Chaplains' Dept.
Maj. John Williamson Milligan, East Africa Supply Corps
Capt. George Ernest Millner  London Reg.
Rev. Eric Milner Milner-White, Royal Army Chaplains' Dept.
Maj. Cecil Francis Milsom, Army Service Corps
Tmp Col. Thomas Herbert Minshall, General List
Maj. Arthur Mitchell, Royal Garrison Arty.
Maj. Archibald Madame Mitchell, Royal Scots
Capt. Charles Mitchell, Grenadier Guards
Capt. William Gore Sutherland Mitchell  Highland Light Inf.
Tmp Major Thomas Hassard Montgomery, Army Service Corps
Maj. Edward Duke Moore, East Riding Yeomanry
Maj. Edward Henry Milner Moore, RAMC
Lt.-Col., George Abraham Moore  RAMC
Maj. Charles Robert Faulconer Morgan, Army Service Corps
Maj. Thomas Bettesworth Moriarty, RAMC
Lt.-Cmdr. Edward N. Groves Morris, Royal Naval Volunteer Reserve, attd. Royal Naval Air Service
Maj. Jolm Hugh Morris, Army Service Corps
Lt.-Col. and Bt. Col. Frederick Lansdowne Morrison  Highland Light Inf.
Tmp Capt. Robert Charles Stuart Morrison-Scott, Royal Marine Arty.
Lt.-Col. Sidney Pelham Morter, Royal Field Arty.
Tmp Major Albert Isaac Mossop, attd. Oxfordshire & Buckinghamshire Light Inf.
Lt.-Col. Hugh Crawford Moultrie, Royal Arty.
Lt.-Col. Charles Carter Moxon  Yorkshire Light Inf.
Tmp Major John Carr Muriel, Royal Inniskilling Fusiliers
Capt. Edward Lionel Mussor  Manchester Reg.
Maj. Lenox Arthur Dutton, Naper, Royal Field Arty.
Maj. Henry Edmund Palmer-Nash, Royal Scots
Maj. Roderick Macaulay Bernard Needhan, Suffolk Reg.
Capt. Duncan Ferguson Dempsterr Neill, Royal Engineers
Capt. Redmond Barry Neill, Royal Irish Fusiliers
Lt.-Col. Richard Austin Nevill, Royal Engineers
Maj. Gervys Charles Nevile, Royal Field Arty.
Maj.-Thomas Clifford Newbold, Nottinghamshire and Derbyshire Reg.
Maj. Edward Hills Nicholson, Royal Fusiliers
Capt. Hugh Blomfield Nicholson, King's Royal Rifle Corps
Maj. Cecil Paterson Nickalls, Royal Field Arty.
Maj. John, Scott Nimmo, Royal Army Veterinary Corps
Maj. Samuel Richard Normand, Royal Garrison Arty.
Maj. Arthur Ernest Norton, West Indian Reg.
Tmp Lt.-Col. William Kilminster Notley
Tmp Major Allan Vaughan Nutt, York & Lancaster Reg.
Tmp Major Norman Henry Nutt, Tank Corps
Lt.-Col. William Coope Gates, Nottinghamshire and Derbyshire Reg.
Tmp Lt.-Col. Henry Rogham O'Brien, Royal Engineers
Lt.-Col. William Tasker Odam, Royal Field Arty.
Tmp Major Richard John Lanford O'Donoghue, Army Service Corps
Tmp Lt.-Col. Robert James Leslie Ogilby, London Reg.
Maj. David Ogilvy, Royal Engineers
Tmp Major Bernardine O'Gorman, General List
Maj. and Bt. Lt.-Col. Gerald Maxwell Orr, Lancers
Lt.-Col. Lewis James Osborn, Royal Arty., Royal Field Arty.
Capt. George Cecil Rudall Overton, Royal Fusiliers
Capt. Lindsay Cunliffe Owen, Royal Engineers
Tmp Major Norman Henry Oxenham, Machine Gun Corps
Capt. and Bt. Major Bernard Charles Tolver-Paget  Oxfordshire & Buckinghamshire Light Inf.
Rev. Reginald Palmer  Royal Army Chaplains' Dept.
Maj. Thomas Kenyon Pardoe, Worcestershire Reg.
Maj. James Dove Park, Royal Engineers
Tmp Capt. Albert Chevallier-Parker, Special List
Capt. George Singleton Parkinson, RAMC
Maj. Henry Evan Pateshall, Herefordshire Reg.
Maj. Sir Everard Philip Digby Pauncefort-Duncombe  Buckinghamshire Yeomanry
Maj. Denys Whitmore Payne  Royal Garrison Arty.
Tmp Capt. Herbert Gerald Payne, General List
Maj. Hugh Drummond Pearson, Royal Engineers
Maj. Thomas William Pearson, Royal Field Arty.
Lt.-Col. William Carmichael Peebles, Royal Scots
Capt. Home Peel  London Reg.
Local Major Willoughby Ewart Peel, Camel Transport Corps
Tmp Capt. Albert James Pelling  Royal Engineers
Rev. Douglas Raymond Pelly, Royal Army Chaplains' Dept.
Hon. Lt. Bertie Howard Penn, Army Ordnance Depot
Lt.-Col. Frederick Septimus Penny  RAMC
Tmp Major William Petty, Seaforth Highlanders
Capt. Ernest Cyril Phelan  RAMC
Lt.-Col. Henry Ramsay Phipps, Royal Field Arty.
Tmp Major William John Phythian-Adams  Royal Fusiliers
Capt. Jocelyn Arthur Adair Pickard, Royal Engineers
Maj. Frederick Alfred Pile  Royal Arty.
Capt. John Ryland Pisent, Royal Engineers
Maj. and Bt. Lt.-Col. William Richard Pinwill, Liverpool Reg.
Tmp Major Oswald Bertram Fisher Planck, Army Service Corps
Lt. Ian Stanley Ord Playfair  Royal Engineers
Maj. Thomas Herman Plummer, Royal Garrison Arty.
Lt. James Frederick Plunkett  Royal Irish Reg.
Capt. Alexander Morton Pollard, RAMC
Capt. Robert Valentine Pollok, Irish Guards
Maj. and Bt. Lt.-Col. Cyril Lachlan Porter, East Kent Reg.
Capt. James Herbert Porter, North Staffordshire Reg.
Maj. Edward Charles Pottinger, Royal Arty.
Maj. Eden Bernard Powell, Rifles
Brig Lt.-Col. Edgar Elkin Powell, RAMC
Tmp Major Randolph MacHattie Powell, Royal Garrison Arty.
Maj. Thomas Power, M.L.B.
Maj. Henry Royds Pownall  Royal Field Arty.
Tmp Major Albert Ernest Prescott, Royal Engineers
Maj. Classon O'Driscoll Preston, Royal Field Arty.
Maj. Walter Clavel Herbert Prichard, Royal Engineers
Maj. Peregrine Prince, Shropshire Light Inf.
Tmp Major Edward Robert Seymour Prior  South Lancashire Reg.
Lt. Percy William Prockter, Army Service Corps
Maj. Demson Pudsey, Royal Field Arty.
Capt. Richard Brownlow Purey-Cust  Royal Field Arty.
Maj. Alfred Hutton Radice, Gloucestershire Reg., South Wales Borderers
Capt. Rowan Scrope Rait Kerr  Royal Engineers
Capt. Gerard Marland Rambaut, Royal Field Arty.
Maj. James Gordon Ramsay, Cameron Highlanders
Capt. and Bt. Major Algernon Lee Ransome  Dorsetshire Reg.
Maj. and Bt. Lt.-Col. Cecil Godfrey Rawling  Somerset Light Inf.
Capt. John George Grey Rea, Yeomanry
Maj. Robert Clanmalier Reeves, Royal Field Arty.
Maj. Charles Savile Reid, Royal Engineers
Lt. Henry Thomas Rendell, Army Service Corps
Tmp Major John Walter Keyell, Royal Engineers
Capt. John Phillip Rhodes, Royal Engineers
Maj. Ernest Evelyn Rich, Royal Horse Arty.
Tmp Capt. John Frederick Gwyther Richards  RAMC
Maj. Gerald Arthur Richards  Royal Arty.
Maj. George Carr Richardson  Royal Arty.
Lt.-Col. Robert Buchanan Riddell, Royal Garrison Arty.
Tmp Major The Hon. Harold Ritchie, Scottish Rifles
Lt.-Col. Colin McLeod Robertson, Royal Garrison Arty.
Maj. Frank Mansfield Boileau Robertson, Royal Highlanders
Maj. William Cairnes Robertson, Royal Garrison Arty.
Capt. Robert William Barrington Robertson-Eustace, East African Forces
Maj. Annesley Craven Robinson, Army Service Corps
Maj. John Armstrong Purefoy Robinson, Royal Garrison Arty.
Maj. Thomas Chambers Robinson, East Lancashire Reg.
Maj. Cyril Edmund Alan Spencer Rocke, Irish Guards
Maj. Harold Bowyer Roffey, Lancashire Fusiliers
Tmp Major Myles Herbert Roffey, Welsh Reg.
Maj. Walter Lacy Yea Rogers, Royal Horse Arty.
Tmp Major Norman Thomas Rolls, Royal West Surrey Reg.
Maj. and Bt. Lt.-Col. Claudo Stuart Rome, 11th Hussars
Maj. Everard Howe Rooke, Royal Engineers
Capt. Edward Ridgill Roper  Royal Field Arty.
Capt. Robert Knox Ross  Royal West Surrey Reg.
Maj. William Edward Rothwell, Royal Inniskilling Fusiliers
Maj. Wilfred Barton Rowe, Royal Garrison Arty.
Lt.-Col. Frank George
Mathias Rowley  Middlesex Reg.
Lt. Albert Russell, Royal Engineers
Col. Bruce Bremner Russell
Maj. Noel Hunsley Campbell Russell, Leinster Reg., and Worcestershire Yeomanry
Tmp Major William Malcolm Russell, General List
Maj. William Thomas Cutler Rust, Army Service Corps
Maj. Hugh Thomas Ryan, Royal Army Veterinary Corps
Capt. Julian Neil Oscar Rycroft  Royal Highlanders
Maj. Harold Francis Salt, Royal Arty.
Maj. Edward Vipan Sarson, Royal Field Arty.
Maj. Lionel Robert Schuster, Liverpool Reg.
Tmp Major Albert Edward Scothern, Nottinghamshire and Derbyshire Reg.
Capt. John Davie Scott, Royal Irish Reg.
Capt. John Walter Lennox Scott, RAMC
Maj. William Scott-Elliot, Army Service Corps
Maj. Hugh Forde Searight, 1st Dragoon Guards
Tmp Major Frank Searle, Tank Corps
Maj. Thomas Byrne Sellar  late King's Own Scottish Borderers
Capt. Hugh Garden Seth-Smith, Army Service Corps
Capt. Reginald Henry Napier-Settle  19th Hussars
Maj. Evelyn Francis Edward-Seymour, Royal Dublin Fusiliers
Maj. Roger Cecil Seys, Royal Arty.
Capt. Arthur Talbot Shakespear  Royal Engineers
Capt. and Bt. Major George Frederick Cortland Shakespear  Indian Army
Maj. Charles Schmidt Sharpe, York & Lancaster Reg.
Tmp Major William Shaw, Army Service Corps
Maj. Henry Francis Shea  RAMC
Capt. Charles Edward Gowran Shearman  Bedfordshire Reg.
Tmp Major Robert Austin Shebbeare, Army Service Corps
Capt. John Reginald Vivian Sherston  Cav. Indian Army
Capt. William John Townsend Shorthose, South Staffordshire Reg., and King's African Rifles
Maj. Cecil Barrow Simonds, Royal Garrison Arty.
Capt. William ArthurJohn Simpson  Royal Field Arty.
Maj. James Robert Simson, Highland Light Inf.
Rev. Patrick Sinclair  Royal Army Chaplains' Dept.
Maj. Alexander Baird Skinner, Indian Army Cav.
Q.M. and Hon. Major Edmund William Skinner, Lincolnshire Reg.
Lt.-Col. Edward Wheeler Slayter  RAMC
Maj. Arthur John Henry Sloggett, Rifle Brigade
Capt. Lovell Francis Smeathman  Hertfordshire Reg.
Capt. Arthur Francis Smith  Coldstream Guards
Capt. Isham Percy Smith, Royal Garrison Arty.
Capt. William Selwyn Smith, Royal Field Arty.
Maj. Gerald James Watt Smyth, Royal Engineers
Lt.-Col. Henry Smyth, Cheshire Reg.
Lt.-Col. George Abraham Smyth, Royal Field Arty.
Maj. Rupert Caesar Smythe, Royal Inniskilling Fusiliers
Lt. William Fulton Somervail  Scottish Rifles
Capt. Herbert George Sotheby, Argyll and Sutherland Highlanders
Lt.-Col. Charles Louis Spencer, Royal Engineers
Capt. Hugh Baird Spens, Scottish Rifles
Tmp Capt. Alfred William Speyer, General List, late West Yorkshire Reg.
Capt. Sidney Stallard, London Reg.
Hon. Capt. Alfred Richard Stamford, Army Ordnance Depot
Maj. The Hon. Oliver Hugh Stanley, Royal Arty.
Tmp Major William Alan Stanley, Machine Gun Corps
Capt. Arthur Christopher Lancelot Stanley-Clarke, Scottish Rifles
Maj. William Lockhart St. Clair, Royal Field Arty.
Tmp Major William Jones Steele, Royal Engineers
Tmp Lt.-Col. Arthur Stephenson  Royal Scots
Lt.-Col. Henry Kenyon Stephenson Royal Field Arty.
Capt. Charles Knowles Steward  South Wales Borderers
Tmp Major Albert Lewis Stewart, Machine Gun Corps
Maj. William Murray Stewart, Cameron Highlanders
Capt. and Bt. Major Walter Robert Stewart  Rifle Brigade
Capt. Alexander Dickson Stirling  RAMC
Capt. Colin Robert Hoste Stirling  Scottish Rifles
Maj. Walter Andrew Starling  Royal Arty.
Maj. William Eustace St. John, Yeomanry
Maj. Ashton Alexander St. Hill, West Riding Reg.
Capt. Hugh Morton Stobart, Yeomanry
Tmp Capt. Adrian Stokes  RAMC
Cat Henry Howard Stoney, North Staffordshire Reg.
Maj. Martyn Rogers Strover, Royal Garrison Arty.
Maj. Edward Lisle Strutt, Royal Scots
Maj. Francis Cyril Rupert Studd, East Kent Reg.
Tmp Major Montague Alfred Sliney Sturt, Army Service Corps
Lt.-Col. Charles William Swinton, Royal Garrison Arty.
Maj. William Frederick John Symonds, London Reg.
Tmp Major Henry Leslie Aldersey Swann, Army Service Corps
Capt. Ernest John Bocart Tagg, Royal Marine Light Inf.
Tmp 2nd Lt. Bruce Mitchell Taylor  Duke of Cornwall's Light Inf.
Maj. Charles Lancaster Taylor, South Wales Borderers
Maj. Glenleigh John Schill Taylor, Royal Field Arty.
Capt. George Pritchard Taylor  RAMC
Maj. Henry Jeffreys Taylor, Durham Light Inf.
Capt. George Harris Teall, Lincolnshire Reg.
Capt. and Bt. Major Richard Durand Temple, Worcestershire Reg.
Capt. James Hugh Thomas  RAMC
Lt.-Col. Henry Melville Thomas  Royal Arty.
Tmp Major Basil Thomas, Gloucestershire Reg.
Tmp Lt.-Col. Albert Charles Thompson, Royal Dublin Fusiliers
Tmp Lt. Claude Ernest Thompson  South Lancashire Reg.
Maj. Cyril Henry Farrer Thompson, London Reg.
Maj. James George Coulthered Thompson, Royal Field Arty.
Capt. William Irwin Thompson  RAMC
Capt. George Thomson  Yorkshire Light Inf.
Maj. George Edward Mervyn Thorneycroft, Royal Arty.
Maj. Cudbert John Massey Thornhill, Indian Army
Lt.-Col. Arthur Hugh Thorp, Royal Garrison Arty.
Lt.-Col. John Claude Thorp, Army Ordnance Depot
Lt. Alexander Tillett  Devonshire Reg.
Maj. Clement Thurstan Tomes  Royal Warwickshire Reg.
Capt. Julian Latham Tomlin, Royal Engineers
Lt.-Col. Francis William Towsey  West Yorkshire Reg.
Maj. Edmund Francis Tarlton Traill, Army Service Corps
Maj. John Brereton Owst Trimble  Yorkshire Reg.
Tmp Major Frederick George Trobridge, General List
Capt. Gerald Louis Johnson Tuck, Unattd. List, attd. Suffolk Reg.
Lt.-Col. Donald Fiddes Tulloch, Royal Arty.
Maj. Canning Turner, Leicestershire Reg.
Capt. Reginald Aubrey Turner  Royal Engineers
Tmp Capt. Clifford Charles Horace Twiss, East Yorkshire Reg.
Maj. Weratwarth Francis Tyndale  RAMC
Capt. William Tyrrell  RAMC
Maj. Thurlo Richardson Ubsdell, late Royal Arty.
Maj. John Salusbury Unthank, Durham Light Inf.
Lt. James Alastair Berry Urquhart, Royal Garrison Arty.
Rev. George Ross Vallings, Royal Army Chaplains' Dept.
Tmp Capt. Sir Harry Calvert Williams Verney  General List
Maj. Leonard Morris Verney  Royal Army Veterinary Corps
Q.M. and Hon. Major George Edward Vickers, Manchester Reg.
Lt. Oliver G. G. Villiers, Royal Naval Volunteer Reserve, attd. Royal Naval Air Service
Maj. Patrick Villiers-Stuart, Royal Fusiliers
Maj. Ernest Blechynden Waggett  RAMC
Lt.-Col. Arthur Reginald Wainewright, Royal Arty.
Maj. Roland Henry Waithman, Royal Sussex Reg.
Tmp Capt. George Goold Walker  Royal Garrison Arty.
Capt. and Bt. Major Charles John Wallace  Highland Light Inf.
Tmp Capt. James Hardress de Warrenne Waller, Royal Engineers
Maj. Hubert de Lansey Walters, Royal Garrison Arty.
Maj. Harold Mathias Arthur Ward Royal Garrison Arty.
Maj. Joseph Ward, RAMC
Maj. George William Webb Ware  RAMC
Maj. Henry Archibald Waring, Royal West Kent Reg.
Maj. Lionel Edward Warren, Royal Field Arty.
Maj. Edward Robert Cabell Warrens, Royal Field Arty.
Maj. Philip Huskinson Warwick, Yeomanry
Maj. James Way  Royal Arty.
Tmp Major Harry Reginald Bland Wayman, Northumberland Fusiliers
Maj. Adrian Barclay Wayte, Nottinghamshire and Derbyshire Reg.
Q.M. and Hon. Major Walter Edward Webb, London Reg.
Capt. Ronald Moree Weeks  South Lancashire Reg.
Maj. Barrington Clement Wells, Essex Reg.
Capt. Richard Annesley West, Yeomanry
Lt.-Col. Frederick Malcolm Westropp, Royal Engineers
Maj. Frederick Whalley  RAMC
Tmp Major Wynn Powell Wheldon, Royal Welsh Fusiliers
Maj. William Stobart Whetherly, Hussars
Capt. Arthur Percy Buncombe Whitaker, Army Service Corps
Charles Richardson White, Army Medical Corps
Maj. and Bt. Lt.-Col. Frank Augustin Kinder, White, Royal Engineers
Tmp Lt. Noel Blanco White  General List
Maj. and Bt. Lt.-Col. The Hon. Robert White  Reserve of Ofc.s
Lt.-Col. Edmund l'Estrange Whitehead, Royal Arty.
Tmp Major Hector Fraser Whitehead, East Lancashire Reg.
Lt.-Col. Edward Nathan Whitley  Royal Arty.
Maj. Everard le Grice Whitting  Royal Arty.
Tmp Major Alan Roderick Whittington, Army Service Corps
Lt. William Henry Whyte, Royal Dublin Fusiliers
Capt. Harold Hartley Wilberforce, Army Service Corps
Maj. Edward Harold Wildblood, Leinster Reg.
Lt. Cyril Francis Wilkins  Royal Irish Rifles
Tmp Major Harris Vaughan Wilkinson, Machine Gun Corps
Capt. James Lugard Willcocks  Royal Highlanders
Capt. Henry Beresford Dennitts Willcox  Nottinghamshire and Derbyshire Reg.
Maj. George Arthur Seccombe Williams, South Staffordshire Reg. (Spec. Reserve)
Maj. Herbert Mamwanng Williams, Royal Army Veterinary Corps
Rev. Ronald Charles Lambert Williams, Royal Army Chaplains' Dept.
Lt.-Col. Frederick George Willock, Royal Field Arty.
Maj. Albert Edward Jacob Wilson, Somerset Light Inf.
Maj. Donald Clitheroe Wilson, Royal Field Arty.
Tmp Capt. Douglas Hamilton Wilson, General List
Maj. James Herbert Roche Winder  RAMC
Capt. Gordon Bluett Winch, Royal Field Arty.
Maj. and Bt. Lt.-Col. Godfrey Harold Fenton Wingate, Royal Scots
Tmp Lt.-Col. Ernest Arthur Winter  Royal Fusiliers
Lt.-Col. William Maunder Withycombe  Yorkshire Light Inf.
Maj. James Wood, RAMC
Capt. Wilfred James Woodcock, Lancashire Fusiliers
Capt. William Talbot Woods  Manchester Reg.
Maj. Robart James Wordsworth, Nottinghamshire and Derbyshire Reg.
Maj. Percy Reginald Worrall  Devonshire Reg.
Maj. Stephen Henry Worrrall, Border Reg.
Capt. Andrew Rae Wright  RAMC
Maj. Hubert Howard Wright, Army Service Corps
Maj. and Bt. Lt.-Col. Wallace Duffield Wright  Royal West Surrey Reg.
Maj. William Oswald Wright, Royal Lancaster Reg.
Lt.-Col. Arthur Oliver Bird Wroughton, RAMC
Capt. Jasper William George Wyld  Oxfordshire & Buckinghamshire Light Inf.
Maj. Guy George Egerton Wylly  Indian Army
Tmp Major Charles Sandford Wynne-Eyton, General List, and Royal Flying Corps
Maj. Cecil McGrigor Yates, Royal Arty.
Maj. Robert James Burton Yates, Indian Army Cav.
Maj. Richard Lister York, Royal Field Arty.
Maj. Arthur Allan Shakespear Younger, Royal Field Arty.
2nd Lt. James Allardyce  London Reg.
Maj. Arthur Harold Bibby, Royal Field Arty.
Tmp Capt. Patrick Dick Booth  Royal Field Arty.
Capt. and Bt. Major Austin Hanbury Brown  Royal Engineers
Lt. Frederick Arthur Montague Browning, Grenadier Guards
Tmp Capt. Ferguson Fitton Carr-Harris  RAMC
2nd Lt. Joseph Percy Castle, West Riding Reg.
Tmp Major Vernon Douglas Robert Conlan, Army Service Corps
Maj. Anthony Courage  Hussars
Maj. Murray Heathneld Dendy  Royal Arty.
Lt. Andrew May Duthie, London Reg.
Lt. William Maurice Evans, South Wales Borderers
Capt. Charles Robert Gerard, Grenadier Guards
Capt. Philip Mannock Glasier, London Reg.
Lt. Tom Goodall, West Riding Reg.
2nd Lt. Guthrie Hallsmith, Suffolk Reg.
Lt. John Steven Hamilton, West Yorkshire Reg.
Tmp Lt. John Eliot Hancock, Norfolk Reg.
Capt. James Francis Harter  Royal Fusiliers
Lt. Cyril Walter Holcroft, Worcestershire Reg.
Capt. Herbert Selwyn Jackson, West Riding Reg.
Tmp 2nd Lt. William George James, Yorkshire Light Inf.
2nd Lt. William Joffe, Yorkshire Light Inf.
Capt. Kenneth Alfred Johnston, Hampshire Reg.
2nd Lt. Edward Spurin Knight, London Reg.
Tmp Capt. Charles Robert Lucas, Royal Lancaster Reg.
Lt. Alfred Cecil Lynn, Yorkshire Light Inf.
2nd Lt. John Francis Maginn, London Reg.
Tmp Capt. Francis Morgan Mathias, Welsh Reg.
2nd Lt. James Thomas Byford McCudden  General List, and Royal Flying Corps
2nd Lt. Andrew Edward McKeever  Royal Flying Corps
Tmp Major David Watts Morgan, Labour Corps
Capt. and Bt. Major The Hon. Thomas George
Breadalbane TVtorgan-Grenville-Gavin  Rifle Brigade
Lt. Charles Stone Moxon, West Riding Reg.
Maj. Sir Christopher William Nixon  Royal Arty.
2nd Lt. James Partridge Notman, Seaforth Highlanders
2nd Lt. Gerald O'Brien, Royal Munster Fusiliers
Maj. Cecil Henry Pank, Middlesex Reg.
2nd Lt. William Paul  West Yorkshire Reg.
2nd Lt. James Peel  Royal Fusiliers
Maj. Gilbert Sandford Poole, Yeomanry
Maj. Rowland Edward Power, East Kent Reg.
Tmp Major John Brenchley Rosher  Durham Light Inf.
Maj. Charles Frank Rundall, Royal Engineers
Lt.-Col. George Gray Russell, King Edward's Horse
Lt.-Col. Cecil John Herbert Spence-Jones, Yeomanry
Maj. Charles Arthur Algernon Stidson  RAMC
Capt. and Bt. Major John Alexander Stirling  Scots Guards
Tmp Major Leycester Penrhyn Storr, Liverpool Reg.
Lt. Gerald Fitzgerald-Stuart, West Yorkshire Reg.
Tmp 2nd Lt. John Edwin Tillotson, West Yorkshire Reg.
2nd Lt. Elliot Clarke Tuckey, Royal Field Arty.
Tmp 2nd Lt. William Arthur Upton, Wiltshire Reg.
Tmp Lt.-Col. Herbert Lawton Warden, East Surrey Reg.
Lt. Guy Randolph Westmacott, Grenadier Guards
Capt. and Bt. Major Bevil Thomson Wilson, Royal Engineers

Australian Imperial Force
Maj. Alan Sinclair Durvall Barton, Army Medical Corps
Maj. Thomas Harold Bird, Light Horse Reg.
Lt.-Col. Jaanes Jamison Black, Army Medical Corps
Lt.-Col. William Brazenor, Inf.
Maj. William Francis Noel Bridges, Inf.
Lt.-Col. Samuel Roy Burston, Army Medical Corps
Maj. David Duncan Jade, Army Medical Corps
Lt.-Col. Herbert Gordon Carter, Pioneer Battalion
Maj. Richard Gardiner Casey  Inf.
Maj. Clement Lorne Chapman, Army Medical Corps
Maj. Alexander Chisholm, Light Horse Reg.
Maj. Walter Churchus, Field Arty.
Maj. Eric Winfield Connelly, Inf.
Tmp Lt.-Col. James Montague Christian Corlette, Engineers
Maj. John Joseph Corngan, Inf.
Maj. Tannatt William Edgeworth David  Engineers
Lt.-Col. William Joihn Stevens Davidson, Field Arty.
Lt.-Col. Michael Henry Downey, Army Medical Corps
Lt.-Col. Richard Dowse, Staff
Lt.-Col. Edmund Alfred Drake Broekman  Inf.
Lt.-Col. Bernard Oscar Charles Duggan, Inf.
Maj. Percy Malcolm Edwards, Field Arty.
Maj. William Gordon Farquhar, Engineers
Maj. Hubert Cedric Ford, Inf.
Maj. William Reginald Rogers Ffrench  Machine Gun Corps
Maj. Vivian Harold Gatliff, Field Arty.
Maj. Richard Stewart Gee, Field Arty.
Capt. Henry James Hill Glover, Field Arty.
Lt.-Col. Henry Arthur Goddard, Inf.
Maj. John Leslie Hardie, General List
Maj. James Douglas Henry, Engineers
Lt.-Col. Ernest Edward Herrod, Inf.
Lt.-Col. William Alexander Henderson, Pioneer Battalion
Maj. Max Henry, Royal Army Veterinary Corps
Maj. Basil Holmes, Inf.
Col. Alexander Jobson, Inf.
Maj. Robert Kerr, Provost Company
Maj. William Selwyn King, Army Service Corps
Lt.-Col. Giffard Hamilton Macarthur King  Field Arty.
Maj. Robert Edward Jackson, Inf.
Lt.-Col. John Dudley Lavarack, Arty.
Maj. Frederick Washington Lawson, Engineers
Lt.-Col. Henry Dundas Keith Macartney, Field Arty.
Maj. Patrick John McCormack, Field Arty.
Maj. Roy Stanley McGregor, Army Medical Corps
Maj. Louis Evander McKenzie, Royal Army Veterinary Corps
Q.M. and Hon. Major Charles Francis Minagall, Inf.
Lt.-Col. John Wesley Mitchell, Inf.
Maj. David Henry Moore, Field Arty.
Lt.-Col. Arthur Henry Moseley, Army Medical Corps
Maj. Edric Noel Mulligan, Australian Engineers
Lt.-Col. Henry Simpson Newland, Army Medical Corps
Lt.-Col. Edward Creer Nome, Inf.
Maj. Edwin Andrew Olding, Field Arty.
Maj. John Joseph Power, Army Medical Corps
Lt.-Col. Edgar Maurice Ralph, General List
Lt.-Col. George Arthur Read, Inf.
Maj. John Dalyell Richardson, Light Horse Reg.
Maj. Harold William Riggall, Field Arty.
Maj. Septimus Godorphin Rowe, Field Arty.
Maj. Edward Irvine Charles Scott, Pioneer Battalion
Maj. Herbert James Shannon, Light Horse Reg.
Lt.-Col. Joseph Lexden Shellshear, Field Artv
Lt.-Col. James Charles Francis Slane, Inf.
Maj. Dudley Wallace Arabin Smith, Light Horse Reg.
Maj. William Smith, Provost Corps
Lt.-Col. William Stansfield, Army Service Corps
Lt.-Col. John Mitchell Young Stewart, Army Medical Corps
Maj. Harold Bourne Taylor, Field Arty.
Lt.-Col. Alexander Hopkins Thwaites, Army Medical Service
Maj. Claude John Tozer, Army Medical Corps
Lt.-Col. Hugh Venables Vernon, Field Arty.
Tmp Lt.-Col. Charles Ernest Wassell, Army Medical Corps
Lt.-Col. Ernest Morgan Williams, Light Horse Reg.
Maj. Henry James Williams, Army Medical Corps
Maj. Eric Arundel Wilton, Machine Gun Corps
Lt.-Col. Percy William Woods  Inf.
Lt.-Col. Arthur Raff Woolcock, Inf.
Maj. Malwyn Hayley à Beckett, Inf.
Lt.-Col. Murray William James Bourchier, Light Horse Reg.
Tmp Lt.-Col. Donald Cameron, Light Horse Reg.
Capt. George Vernon Davies, Army Medical Corps
Capt. Robert Derwent Dixon, Australian Inf.
Maj. Cuthbert Murchison Fetherstonhaugh, Light Horse Reg.
Maj. Reginald Norris Franklin, Light Horse Reg.
Lt.-Col. Robert Oswald Henderson, Inf.
Maj. Eric Montague Hyman, Light Horse Reg.
Maj. James Lawson, Light Horse Reg.
Maj. Leslie Herbert Payne, Inf.
Maj. Jeremiah Charles Selmes, Field Arty.
Maj. Roy Meldrum Thompson  Field Arty.

Canadian Force
Capt. Samuel Buttrey Birds  Inf.
Lt.-Col. Allison Hart Borden, Inf.
Maj. Alexander Grant, Inf.
Maj. John Alexander McEwan, Inf.
Lt.-Col. Andrew George Latta McNaughton, Field Arty.
Maj. Frederick Jackson Alderson, Field Arty.
Lt.-Col. Carleton Woodford Allen, Pioneer Battalion
Maj. Alexander Alderson Anderson, Engineers
Maj. Thomas Victor Anderson, Engineers
Maj. Alfred Turner Bazin, Army Medical Corps
Maj. Percy George Bell, Army Medical Corps
Maj. Charles Corbishley Bennett, Inf.
Maj. Robert Bickerdike, Inf.
Maj. Alfred Sidney Buttenshaw, Ordnance Company
Lt.-Col. Glen Campbell, Pioneer Battalion
Lt.-Col. Robert Percy Clark  Inf.
Lt.-Col. Frederick Fieldhouse Clarke, Railway Troops
Maj. George Alton Cline, Engineers
Maj. Frederick Thomas Coghlan, Field Arty.
Lt.-Col. James Kennedy Cornwall, Railway Troops
Maj. Ian Laurie Crawford, Inf.
Lt.-Col. James Edgar Davey, Army Medical Corps
Lt.-Col. Charles Harold Dickson, Army Medical Corps
Maj. Robert Loggie Masterson Donaldson, Ordnance Company
Lt.-Col. John Badenoch Donnelly, Forestry Company
Lt.-Col. William Henry Pferinger Elkins, Horse Arty.
Maj. Thomas Francis Elmitt, Inf.
Tmp Major Royal Lindsay Hamilton Ewing  Inf.
Maj. James Johnston Fraser, Army Medical Corps
Maj. Thomas Gibson, Labour Battalion
Maj. Edward Crosby Goldie, Army Service Corps
Lt.-Col. Atholl Edwin Griffin, Railway Troops
Tmp Major The Hon. Francis Egerton Grosvenor  Inf.
Lt.-Col. Edwin Gerald Hanson, Field Arty.
Maj. Edward Montgomery Harris, Army Service Corps
Lt.-Col. William Henry Harrison, Field Arty.
Maj. Harry Cecil Hatch, Inf.
Maj. Halfdan Fenton Harboe Hertzberg  Engineers
Lt.-Col. Chilion Longley Hervey, Railway Troops
Lt.-Col. Charles Rapelje Hill, Inf.
Maj. Walter Court Hyde, Field Arty.
Lt.-Col. George Chalmers Johnston  Mounted Rifles
Maj. George Knight Killam, Inf.
Maj. Charles Ernest King, Inf.
Tmp Lt.-Col. Thomas McCrae Leask, Army Medical Corps
Lt.-Col. William Bethune Lindsay  Engineers
Maj. Edison Franklin Lynn  Engineers
Maj. William Broder McTaggart, Field Arty.
Maj. Donald John Macdonald  Cav.
Lt.-Col. James Brodie Lauder Macdonald, Railway Troops
Maj. Frederick Thomas McKean, Army Service Corps
Capt. William Gordon MacKendrick, Engineers
Maj. James Frederick McParland, Field Arty.
Lt. Charles Kirwan Craufurd Martin, Field Arty.
Lt.-Col. Lawrence Thomas Martin, Railway Troops
Maj. Robert Frank Massie, Field Arty.
Lt. Arthur Clinton Maund, Inf. and Royal Flying Corps
Lt.-Col. Lionel Herbert Millen, Inf.
Lt. Frederick Frank Minchin  Inf., attd. Royal Flying Corps
Maj. Percival John Montague  Inf.
Lt.-Col. Walter Hill Moodie, Railway Troops
Maj. John Aubrey Morphy, Pioneer Battalion
Maj. George Sidney Mothersill, Army Medical Corps
Lt.-Col. Thomas Joseph Francis Murphy, Army Medical Corps
Tmp Capt. Robert Henry Neeland, Labour Company
Maj. Daniel Jerome O'Donahoe, Inf.
Capt. Garnet Lehrle Ord, Pioneer Battalion
Maj. Richard Francis Parkinson, Inf.
Maj. Eric Pepler, Engineers
Lt.-Col. Charles Ayre Peters, Army Medical Corps
Capt. John Downey Pitman, Ordnance Company
Maj. Alan Torrence Powell, Inf.
Lt. Kenneth Alan Ramsay, Railway Troops
Maj. James Sabiston Rankin, Inf.
Maj. Clifford Hamilton Reason, Army Medical Corps
Maj. William Roy Reirdon, Field Arty.
Lt.-Col. Blair Ripley, Railway Troops
Maj. Donald Edward Allan Rispin, Inf.
Maj. Robert Percy Rogers, Engineers
Lt.-Col. James Sclater, Inf.
Capt. Morris Alexander Scott, Machine Gun Corps
Lt.-Col. Samuel Simpson Sharpe, Inf.
Maj. John Ham Sills, Inf.
Maj. Henry Denne St. Alban Smith, Engineers
Capt. Richard Winslow Stayner  Mounted Rifles
Maj. Henry Arthur Stewart, Army Service Corps
Maj. Cecil Valentine Stockwell, Field Arty.
Maj. Joseph Murray Syer, Field Arty.
Capt. David Sobey Tamblyn, Royal Army Veterinary Corps
Maj. Harold Lyndridge Trotter, Engineers
Tmp Col. John Burton White, Forestry Corps
Hon. Lt.-Col. Rev. Albert William Woods, Royal Army Chaplains' Dept.
Maj. Gordon Harold Aikins, Mounted Rifles
Lt. Walter Hartley Burgess, Inf.
Lt. John Angus Cameron, Inf.
Lt. William Francis Jamieson, Inf.
Lt. Hector Kennedy, Inf.
Maj. William Thewles Lawless, Inf.
Lt. Ronald Frederick Macnaghten, Inf.
Capt. Ronald Wilfred Pearson  Inf.
Maj. Harold Murchinson Savage, Field Arty.
Capt. William Keating Walker  Machine Gun Corps
Maj. William Douglas Wilson, Field Arty.
Tmp Capt. Harvey Gordon Young, Canadian Army Medical Corps
Tmp Capt. Archibald Stirling Kennedy Anderson  RAMC
Capt. Rupert Henry Anderson-Morshead, Devonshire Reg.
Lt.-Col. Duncan Gus Baillie, Yeomanry
Maj. Walter Agar Thomas Barstow  Royal Field Arty.
Maj. Richard Maul Birkett, Royal Sussex Reg., attd. Royal West Surrey Reg.
Tmp Capt. James Thornely Bowman  RAMC
Capt. Henry Fergusson Brace, Hussars
Tmp Capt. John Edouard Marsdeu Bromley, Royal Field Arty.
Tmp Capt. John Jackson Cameron, South Staffordshire Reg., attd. Royal Lancaster Reg.
Maj. James Francis Fraser-Tytler, Yeomanry, attd. Cameron Highlanders
Tmp Capt. Howard Boyd Graham  RAMC
2nd Lt. Charles Ernest Henderson, London Reg.
Capt. and Bt. Major Henry Francis
Leonard Hilton-Green  Gloucestershire Reg., attd. A.C. Corps
Lt. Percy Frank Knightley, Royal Welsh Fusiliers
Capt. Arthur McDougall, Yeomanry
Lt. Herbert Dryden Home Yorke Nepean, Indian Army
Maj. John Gordon Rees, Yeomanry, attd. Royal Welsh Fusiliers
Capt. Robert Thin Craig Robertson  RAMC
Capt. Richard Adair Rochfort  Royal Warwickshire Reg., attd. Royal Berkshire Reg.
Capt. Alan Patrick Rodgerson, Indian Army
Maj. Leigh Pemberton Stedall, Yeomanry
Maj. Gerald Gane Thatcher, Royal Garrison Arty., attd. Royal Field Arty.
Capt. and Bt. Major Gerald Lawrence Uniacke, Royal Lancaster Reg.

Newfoundland Force
Capt. Bertram Butler  Newfoundland Reg.

New Zealand Force
Lt.-Col. Stephen Shepherd Allen, Inf.
Maj. Frederick Cameron  New Zealand Medical Corps
Lt.-Col. Alexander Burnet Charters  Inf.
Maj. William Oliver Ennis, Pioneers
Maj. David John Gibbs, Engineers
Maj. Halbert Cecil Glendining, Field Arty
Maj. Edward James Hulbert, Mounted Rifles
Lt.-Col. James Neil McCarroll, Mounted Rifles
Maj. John McCare, Inf.
Lt.-Col. George Mitchell, Inf.
Maj. Donald Sinclair Murchison, Mounted Rifles
Maj. Clarence Nathaniel Newman, Field Arty.
Lt.-Col. Charles Treweck Hand-Newton  New Zealand Medical Corps
Maj. Edward Puttick, Rifle Brigade
Tmp Major Harry McKellar White Richardson  Rifle Brigade
Maj. James Macdonald Richmond  Field Arty.
Lt.-Col. Robert Amos Row, Inf.
Maj. James Stafford, New Zealand Veterinary Corps
Maj. Alan Duncan Stitt  Inf.
Maj. Hugh Vickerman, Engineers
Lt.-Col. Claude Horace Weston, Inf.

South African Force
Tmp Major Charles Agnew Anderson, South African Water Supply Corps
Tmp Major Thomas William Armitage, South African Service Corps
Tmp Major George Edwin Brink, South African Force
Maj. Peter Skinner Clarke, South African Medical Corps
Tmp Lt.-Col. Thomas Harry Blew, Heavy Arty.
Lt.-Col. Ewan Christian, Inf.
Tmp Lt.-Col. Francis Richard Collins, Engineers
Maj. Fred Haselden, Inf.
Maj. Theophilus Edward Liefeldt, Native Labour Corps
Maj. John James Mulvey, Pioneer Battalion
Tmp Capt. Hugh Brindley Owen  Uganda Medical Service
Brig.-Gen.-General William Ernest Collins Tanner  Inf.
Maj. David Morris Tomory, South African Medical Corps
Capt. Charles Frederick Bernard Viney, Mounted Rifles
Lt.-Col. Arthur Blackwood Ward  South African Medical Corps
Tmp Lt.-Col. Gilbert Neville Williams, South African Forces

Awarded a Bar to the Distinguished Service Order (DSO*)
Cmdr. William Marshall  Royal Naval Reserve
Maj. William Nathaniel Stuart Alexander  Connaught Rangers
Capt. and Bt. Major Michael George Henry Barker  Lincolnshire Reg.
Maj. Thomas Andrew Dunlop Best  Royal Inniskilling Fusiliers
Capt. and Bt. Major John Dopping Boyd  Royal West Surrey Reg.
Lt. Charles Henry Dowden  King's Royal Rifle Corps
Maj. Archibald Jenner Ellis  Border Reg.
Maj. and Bt. Lt.-Col. Henry Gaspard de Lavalette Ferguson  attd. Norfolk Reg.
Maj. Marmion Carr Ferrers-Guy  Lancashire Fusiliers
Maj. Ronald Foster Forbes  Highland Light Inf.
Maj. and Bt. Lt.-Col. Sidney Goodall Francis  West Yorkshire Reg.
Lt.-Col. John Malise Anne Graham  Royal Lancaster Reg.
Maj. William Green  Royal Highlanders
Tmp Capt. James Robertson Campbell Greenlees  RAMC
Capt. Cecil Champagne Herbert-Stepney  King's Royal Rifle Corps
Maj. and Bt. Lt.-Col. Charles Graeme Higgins  Oxfordshire & Buckinghamshire Light Inf.
Maj. Clifford Hill  East African Mounted Rifles
Maj. and Bt. Lt.-Col. Sir Thomas Dare Jackson  Royal Lancaster Reg.
Capt. and Bt. Major Alexander Colin Johnston  Worcestershire Reg.
Maj. and Bt. Lt.-Col. Alexander Fraser Campbell Maclachlan  King's Royal Rifle Corps
Maj. Samuel McDonald  Gordon Highlanders
Maj. Reginald George Maturin  Royal Field Arty.
Maj. Arthur Maxwell  London Reg.
Maj. Herbert Milward Milward  Nottinghamshire and Derbyshire Reg.
Maj. Noel Ernest Money  Shropshire Yeomanry
Maj. Hubert Horatio Shirley Morant  Durham Light Inf.
Lt.-Col. Ronald Ernest Murray  British South Africa Police
Tmp Major Sholto Stuart Ogilvie  Wiltshire Reg.
Maj. George Parsons  British South Africa Police
Tmp Lt.-Col. Warren John Peacocke  Royal Inniskilling Fusiliers
Maj. William Moore Bell Sparkes  RAMC
Capt. and Bt. Major Gerald Lawrence Uniacke  Royal Lancaster Reg., and 2nd Nigeria Reg.
Capt. Lancelot Edward Seth Ward  late Oxfordshire & Buckinghamshire Light Inf.
Maj. and Bt. Lt.-Col. Donald Munro Watt  Gurkha Rifles, Indian Army
Capt. and Bt. Major Bertram Charles Maximilian Western  East Lancashire Reg.
Maj. Stuart Lumley Whatford  Yorkshire Reg.
Maj. Thomas Edmund Palmer Wickham  Royal Arty.
Capt. Frank Worthington  RAMC
Maj. Kenneth Duncan  Royal Field Arty.
Maj. George Scott Jackson  Northumberland Fusiliers
Tmp Surgeon William James McCracken 
Maj. Horace Somerville Sewell  Dragoon Guards
Maj. Baptist Johnson Barton  Yorkshire Light Inf.
Lt.-Col. Guy Archibald Hastings Beatty  Indian Cav.
Maj. Alfred Morey Boyall  West Yorkshire Reg.
Maj. Hugh Annesley Gray-Cheape  Yeomanry
Maj. John Hardress-Lloyd  Tank Corps
Capt. Charles Hervey Hoare  Yeomanry
Capt. Edward Darby Jackson  King's Own Scottish Borderers
Tmp Major Charles Kennett James  Border Reg.
Maj. George Knowles  Indian Cav.
Arthur Campden Little  Hussars
Maj. Arthur Mordaunt Mills  Indian Cav.
Maj. Arthur Carr Osburn  RAMC
Lt. James Frederick Plunkett  Royal Irish Reg.
Capt. Geoffrey Taunton Raikes  South Wales Borderers

Australian Imperial Force
Lt.-Col. William Grant  Australian Light Horse
Lt.-Col. Thomas John Todd  Light Horse Reg.
Lt.-Col. Reginald John Albert Travers  Inf.

Canadian Force
Lt.-Col. Denis Colburn Draper  Mounted Rifles Battalion 
Lt.-Col. John Mervyn Prower  Inf.
Lt.-Col. John Munro Ross  Inf.
Maj. Lawrence Vincent Moore Cosgrave  Canadian Arty.
Lt.-Col. William Wasbrough Foster  Canadian Inf.
Maj. George Waters MacLeod  Canadian Inf.
Maj. Hugh Wilderspin Niven  Canadian Inf.

New Zealand Force
Lt.-Col. George Augustus King  Canterbury Reg.
Lt.-Col. Hugh Stewart  Canterbury Reg.
Lt. Col. James Henry Whyte  Wellington Mounted Rifles

Awarded a Second Bar to the Distinguished Service Order (DSO**)
Tmp Lt.-Cmdr. Arthur Holland Asquith  Royal Naval Volunteer Reserve

Military Cross (MC)

Distinguished Conduct Medal (DCM) 
C.S. Maj. S. Aberdeen, Durham Light Inf. (Durham)
C.S. Maj. D. Adair, East Yorkshire Reg. (Durham)
Sgt. A. L. Adams, Royal Engineers (Edinburgh)
Sgt. J. H. Adams, Royal Engineers (Brislington)
Sgt. J. Adamson, Yorkshire Reg. (East Ramton)
Dvr. H. F. Addington, Royal Field Arty. (Church Brampton, Northampton)
C.S. Maj. W. H. Albutt, Royal Welsh Fusiliers (Sparkbrook)
Sgt. F. G. Aldridge, Royal Engineers (Evesham, Worcester)
Petty Ofc. J. Allan, Royal Naval Volunteer Reserve (Annitsford)
Cpl. A. Allen, Royal Garrison Arty. (Belfast)
C.S. Maj. W. T. Alloway, Oxfordshire & Buckinghamshire Light Inf. (Marlow)
Pte. C. Andrews, Royal West Kent Reg. (Poplar, London)
Sgt. A. H. Annear, Royal Garrison Arty. (Plymouth, Devon)
Sgt. C. F. Ash, Royal Garrison Arty. (Chatham)
L. Cpl. H. P. Ashton, Royal Engineers (Moorhurst, Hamps.)
Sgt. W. Askew, King's Royal Rifle Corps (Kenilworth)
Gnr. C. H. G. Anthony, Royal Field Arty. (Aston, Birmingham)
C.Q.M.S. A. J. Appleby, Royal Engineers (Clapton Park)
Sgt. W. J. Avis, Machine Gun Corps (Lewes)
L. Cpl. J. F. Bagshaw, Royal Warwickshire Reg. (Walsall)
Cpl. G. Bailey, Royal Field Arty. (Bristol)
Sgt. F. J. Baker, Royal Field Arty. (Wdlworth)
C.S. Maj. H. T. Baldwin, Hampshire Reg. (Wimbledon, London)
Battery Sergeant Major J. H. Barlow, Royal Field Arty. (Woolwich)
Battery Sergeant Major J. Barnes, Royal Field Arty. (Ramsey, Huntingdon)
Pte. S. Barnes, Manchester Reg. (Oldham)
C.S. Maj. J. Barraclough, Yorkshire Light Inf. (Wakefield)
Capt. J. C. S. Barron, Royal Engineers (North Shields)
Act. C.S. Maj. J. Bartlett, Royal Sussex Reg. (Eastbourne)
Sgt. H. Barton, Royal Irish Fusiliers (Jerrettspas, Newry)
Cpl. J. S. Bastick, Norfolk Reg. (Bethnal Green, London)
Gnr. S. Bate, Royal Field Arty. (Hartlepool)
Sgt. J. Bates, Royal Inniskilling Fusiliers (Liemaskea, County Fermanagh)
Bombr. A. H. Baylis, Royal Field Arty. (Worcester)
C.S. Maj. J. Beaton, Scottish Rifles (Balmain, N.S.W.)
Pte. I. Beaty, Royal Scots (Manchester)
Sgt. W. Bee, Manchester Reg. (Harlesden, London)
Pte. J. Bell, West Riding Reg. (Greenfield)
Act. R.S. Maj. G. F. Bennett, Tank Ops (Leicester)
Pte. W. Bennett, Manchester Reg. (Handforth, Cheshire)
L. Sgt. M. Berkley, Cheshire Reg. (Hirst Ashington, Northumberland)
Sgt. J. Berwick, Border Reg. (Workingdon)
L. Sgt. A. Bickerstaffe, South Lancashire Reg. (St. Helens)
Cpl. F. Birch, Leicestershire Reg. (Hinckley, Leics.)
Gnr. E. Blackwood, Royal Garrison Arty. (Coatbridge)
C.Q.M.S. C. J. Bland, Middlesex Reg. (Upper Holloway, London)
Battery Sergeant Major A. J. Blowers, Royal Field Arty. (Lowestoft)
Battery Sergeant Major J. Blundell, Royal Garrison Arty. (Cork)
Bombr. H. Blythe, Royal Field Arty. (Mansfield, Notts)
Act. Bombr. S. A. Blythe, Royal Garrison Arty. (Melton, Norfolk)
Sgt. H. Bottomley, RAMC (Colchester)
Battery Sergeant Major J. T. Boughen, Royal Field Arty. (Netley)
Sgt. F. Bowcock, Royal Field Arty. (Leek, Staffs.)
2nd Cpl. F. Bownasa, Royal Engineers (E. Bradford)
Sgt. C. H. Boyle, Royal Garrison Arty. (Kingston Hill, Surrey)
L. Sgt. G. T. Boynes, North Lancashire Reg. (Preston)
Sgt. J. Bracegirdle, Royal Garrison Arty. (Carnarvon)
Sgt. S. Bradshaw, Manchester Reg. (Manchester)
Cpl. S. G. Brain, Royal Warwickshire Reg. (Banbury)
C.S. Maj. E. Brake, Somerset Light Inf. (Bath)
Gnr. W. Breakey, Tank Corps. (Edinburgh)
Sgt. H. G. Bridges, Royal Horse Arty. (St. Leonards-on-Sea)
C.S. Maj. E. J. Briffet, Royal Engineers (Bristol)
Act. Staff Sergeant A. Briggs, Army Ordnance Corps (Walworth)
Sgt. B. Briggs, Labour Corps. (Kennington Park, London)
Cpl. F. Briggs, North Lancashire Reg. (Bolton)
Cpl. of Horse W. H. E. Briton, Dragoon Guards (Hereford)
Cpl. A. T. Brooker, Royal Horse Arty.
Battery Sergeant Major F. A. Broomfield, Royal Field Arty. (Stratford, London)
C.S. Maj. A. Broomhead, Nottinghamshire and Derbyshire Reg. (Derby)
C.S. Maj. G. Browell, Northumberland Fusiliers (Newcastle)
Sgt. A. (Brown, York & Lancaster Reg. (Thurnscoe, near Barnsley)
Sgt. A. Brown, Royal Field Arty. (Padiham, Lancaster)
Sgt. J. Brown, Royal Engineers (Mulrkirk)
C.S. Maj. G. Brown, Norfolk Reg. (Thixendale, Malton, Yorkshire)
Cpl. G. D. Brown, King's Royal Rifle Corps (Newton, Yorkshire)
Cpl. W. Brunton, Royal Garrison Arty. (Edinburgh)
C.S. Maj. R. H. Bryan, Royal Warwickshire Reg. (Coventry)
Sgt. F. C. Bryson, Royal Garrison Arty. (Temple Ewell)
C.S. Maj. J. F. Buchanan, Gordon Highlanders (Aberdeen)
Sgt. E. Bullock, Machine Gun Corps (Broseley)
L. Cpl. L. J. Burden, Tank Corps. (Bridgtown)
Cpl. A. Burnett, Royal Field Arty. (Preston)
C.S. Maj. W. Burndge, Royal Welsh Fusiliers (Swansea)
Cpl. H. Burrows, Royal Garrison Arty. (North Waisliam)
Sgt. W. Burrows, Royal Field Arty. (Forest Gate)
Sgt. W. C. Burton, Royal Engineers (Hackney)
Cpl. A. C. Caiger, Oxfordshire & Buckinghamshire Light Inf. (Malvern)
Sgt. J. Cairney, Royal Engineers (Glasgow)
C.S. Maj. A. W. Calder, Seaforth Highlanders (Carr Bridge)
Far. Sergeant W. W. Canham, Royal Field Arty. (Kilkenny)
B.Q.M. Sgt. T. W. Carefoot, East Lancashire Reg. (Burnley)
Battery Sergeant Major J. Carlyle, Royal Field Arty. (Manchester)
Sgt. J. Carmichael, King's Own Scottish Borderers (Chorlton-cum-Hardy)
C.Q.M.S. W. H. Carnie, Welsh Reg. (Cardiff)
Sgt. J. Cassidy, West Yorkshire Reg. (Lincoln)
L. Sgt. L. Chalk, Northamptonshire Reg. (Abbot Langley)
Pte. E. Chambers, North Staffordshire Reg. (Cambefley, Surrey)
C.S. Maj. J. Chance, Worcestershire Reg. (Ryde, Isle of Wight)
C.S. Maj. G. Chandler, Leicestershire Reg. (Cheadle, Staffs.)
Sgt. T. Chapman, Lincolnshire Reg. (Hognaby, Spilsby)
Battery Sergeant Major G. Chappell, Royal Field Arty. (E. London)
Pte. H. Charlton, Nottinghamshire and Derbyshire Reg. (Awsworth)
Sgt. J. C. Charlton, Yorkshire Reg. (Middlesbrough)
C.Q.M.S. J. E. Cherry, East Lancashire Reg. (Colne)
L. Cpl. A. Chesters, Royal Lancaster Reg. (E. Lancaster)
Sgt. E. Chidgey, Royal Engineers (North Petherton)
Far. Q.M.S. W. A. Chmery, Royal Horse Arty. (Frimley, Surrey)
B.Q.M. Sgt. W. H. Christy, Manchester Reg. (Wigan)
Sgt. W. Chrystall, Royal Field Arty. (Aberdeen)
Sgt. W. Churchill, Northumberland Fusiliers (Wallsend)
Sgt. W. B. Churchman, Royal Engineers (College Park, London)
Act. Cpl. G. Clark, Royal Highlanders (Kirkcaldy)
L. Cpl. J. W. Clark, Durham Light Inf. (Easington Colliery)
L. Cpl. R. C. Clark, Royal Engineers (Leytonstone)
C.S. Maj. A. W. Clarke, Army Cyclist Corps (Basington)
Pte. W. L. Claydon, Royal West Surrey Reg. (Colchester)
Sgt. W. Clayton, Royal Garrison Arty. (Uxbridge)
Cpl. W. E. Clayton, Royal Garrison Arty. (Poplar, London)
Reg.al Q.M.S. J. H. Code, Manchester Reg. (Manchester)
C.S. Maj. W. Coldwell, Lincolnshire Reg. (Sheffield)
Sgt. A. J. Cole, Somerset Light Inf. (Henhin, near Bristol)
Sgt. A. Coles, South Wales Borderers (Withington Station, near Hereford)
R.S. Maj. J. T. Colver, Yorkshire Reg. (Leicester)
Pte. E. A. Comer, Dragoon Guards (Addlebourne)
Battery Sergeant Major H. F. Conway, Royal Field Arty. (Uxbridge)
C.S. Maj. J. B. Cook, Royal Lancaster Reg. (Walney)
Sgt. F. J. Cooper, East Surrey Reg. (Shoeburyness)
Sgt. J. Cooper, Gordon Highlanders (Glasgow)
Sgt. T. Cooper, Essex Reg. (Swaffam, Buibeck, Camb.)
C.S. Maj. E. Copping, Grenadier Guards (Clapham Junction)
Cpl. W. Cornell, Royal Field Arty. (Saffron Walden)
Sgt. W. H. Couldwell, Oxfordshire & Buckinghamshire Light Inf. (Reading)
Warrant Ofc. Class 2 W. J. Coward, Gloucestershire Reg. (Stroud, Glouc.)
Pte. J. Cowell, Welsh Reg. (Llandudno)
B.Q.M. Sgt. A. J. Cowley, Royal Field Arty. (Glanworth, County Cork)
Far. Staff Sergeant L. Crabtree, Royal Field Arty. (Exeter)
Sgt. J. Croft, Royal Irish Rifles (Dunmurry)
B.Q.M. Sgt. W. Crombie, King's Own Scottish Borderers (Carlow)
A. Bombardier A. W. Crook, Royal Garrison Arty. (Stamford)
Sgt. C. E. Crooks, Nottinghamshire and Derbyshire Reg. (Mansfield Woodhouse)
Sgt. J. W. Crosby, Royal Garrison Arty. (Wickford, Essex) Royal Marine Arty.
Cpl. F. Cross, Royal Marine Arty.
Cpl. C. H. Crowlie, Royal Field Arty. (Fulbam, London)
C.Q.M.S. G. Crump, Worcestershire Reg. (Worcester)
Sgt. W. Cryer, Lancashire Fusiliers (Facit, Lancaster)
Sgt. W. Cunniugton, Royal Field Arty. (Huddersfield)
C.S. Maj. F. Currey, Durham Light Inf. (Darlington)
B.Q.M. Sgt. J. Currie, Royal Garrison Arty. (Barrow-in-Furness)
C.S. Maj. G. Cuswoxth, West Yorkshire Reg. (Leeds)
Sgt. R. Cuthall, Royal Field Arty. (Arbroath)
C.S. Maj. W. F. Dachtier, London Reg. (London)
Battery Sergeant Major H. Daft, Royal Garrison Arty. (Clayton)
Battery Sergeant Major W. G. Dagg, Royal Field Arty. (Emsworth)
Sgt. J. Diare, South Wales Borderers (Llanhilleth, Mon.)
Act. R.S. Maj. P. Darroch, Royal Scots (Prestonpans)
Sgt. E. N. Davey, Royal Engineers (Wimbledon Park)
L. Sergeant H. V. Davey, Army Cyclist Corps (Hamworth)
Act. R.S. Maj. J. C. Davidge, Welsh Reg. (Abergavemiy)
2nd Cpl. J. H. Davies, Royal Engineers (Softball)
R.S. Maj. W. Davies, South Wales Borderers (Poanswick, Glouc.)
Pte. G. Davis, Border Reg. (Bishopstake)
Sgt. L. Dawe, Royal Field Arty. (Walthamstow)
Sgt. M. Dawes, Royal Field Arty. (Burnley)
Gnr. F. G. C. Dawson, Royal Garrison Arty. (Blackheath)
Battery Sergeant Major E. Day, Royal Horse Arty. (Great Staughton, near St. Neots)
Sgt. F. C. Debenham, Royal Field Arty. (Bergholt, near Colchester)
C.S. Maj. C. J. Deeprose, Royal Sussex Reg. (Rye)
L. Cpl. A. Devenish, Northumberland Fusiliers (Cornsay, County Durham)
C.S. Maj. E. Dickinson, Machine Gun Corps (Grimsby)
Sgt. F. Dickinson, Middlesex Reg. (Leith, Scotland)
Pte. M. Dixon, Shropshire Light Inf. (Gelli, Rhondda)
Cpl. Fitter, W. Dixon, Royal Field Arty. (Leeds)
L. Cpl. G. W. H. Dobson, Military Mounted Police (Whiteleafe, Surrey)
Sgt. G. Donaldson, Yorkshire Light Inf. (Milford)
Sgt. E. J. Donhou, Royal Engineers (Hanwell, London)
Sgt. J. Douglas, King's Own Scottish Borderers (Greenlaw)
Sgt. H. Driver, West Riding Reg. (Bingley)
Sgt. A. W. Duffield, Royal Garrison Arty. (Middlesbrough)
Pte. D1 Duncan, Royal Scots Fusiliers (Kilmarnock)
Cpl. F. Duncan, Royal Engineers (Tayport, Fife)
Battery Sergeant Major S. Eardley, Royal Garrison Arty. (Newcastle, Staffs.)
C.S. Maj. M. Earls, Welsh Reg. (Swansea)
Battery Sergeant Major F. W. Eastley, Royal Garrison Arty. (Southampton)
Cpl. O. J. Edwardes, Royal Engineers (Byfleet)
Battery Sergeant Major A. Elliott, Royal Field Arty. (Southampton)
L. Cpl. J. W. Elliott, Northumberland Fusiliers (Darlington)
Sgt. P. G. Elpiuck, Royal Sussex Reg. (Newick)
C.S. Maj. F. Emmott, Machine Gun Corps (Leeds)
L. Cpl. W. Etchells, Manchester Reg. (Manchester)
Sgt. A.H Evans, Welsh Guards (Marshfield, near Cardiff)
Mechanist Sergeant Major G. A. L. Evans, Army Service Corps (East London)
Sgt. H. V. Evans, West Yorkshire Reg. (Stoke, Staffs.)
Gnr. T. Evans, Royal Horse Arty. (Barnfurlong, near Wigan)
Act. Bombr. H. Eyre, Royal Field Arty. (Chesterfield)
Sgt. A. Falconer, Machine Gun Company (Walthamstow)
Battery Sergeant Major F. Farlie, Royal Horse Arty. (Plumstead)
Sgt. P. Fiarrell, Manchester Reg. (Huddersfield)
Sgt. G. Feast, South Wales Borderers (Eastney, Portsmouth)
Sgt. W. R. Feaver, Middlesex Reg. (Marden, Kent)
Spr. W. J. Feman, Royal Engineers (Liverpool)
C.S. Maj. A. Ferrier, Royal Highlanders (Perth)
Cpl. F. S. Fisher, Royal Field Arty. (Netley, Hamps.)
Sgt. J. Fletcher, Royal Garrison Arty. (Oxford)
C.S. Maj. R. Fletcher, Northumberland Fusiliers (Walker-on-Tyne)
Sgt. J. Flett, Argyll and Sutherland Highlanders (Greenock)
Sgt. W. Flynn, Lancashire Fusiliers (Salford)
R.S. Maj. J. H. Foley, Royal Warwickshire Reg. (Barmingham)
Cpl. C. Ford, Scottish Rifles (Hamilton)
Act. Cpl. F. Forster, Middlesex Reg. (Heaton Bark, Manchester)
Battery Sergeant Major J. W. Foster, Royal Field Arty. (Hull)
Sgt. G. Fowler, North Lancashire Reg. (Dartford, Kent)
Sgt. W. Fraser, Highland Light Inf. (Glasgow)
Pte. E. P. Freeman, Coldstream Guards (Goswell-road, London, EC)
Cpl. C. J. French, Royal Flying Corps (Watford, Herts.)
L. Cpl. R. H. Froude, Royal Engineers (Curraghmore, County Waterford)
Sgt. W. H. Fryer, Machine Gun Corps (Paddington)
Sgt. E. W. Fulford, Royal Engineers (Bedford)
L. Cpl. E. Gaddes, Lancashire Fusiliers (Longtown)
Sgt. J. Galvin, Royal Garrison Arty. (Cork)
Sgt. L. Galvin, West Riding Reg. (Marlborough)
Cpl. G. C. Gane, Somerset Light Inf. (Shepton Mallet)
Cpl. A. Gardner, Royal Scots (Irlam o' th' Heights, Lancaster)
Siapr W. T. Garner, Royal Engineers (Blefaohley)
Sgt. P. Garrod, Royal Fusiliers (Stevenage)
Pte. J. Geoghan, Lancashire Fusiliers (E. West Hartlepool)
Sgt. F. Gibbs, Royal Welsh Fusiliers (Birmingham)
Sgt. C. E. Gillott, Royal Engineers (Sheffield)
Sgt. W. Gilmore, Northumberland Fusiliers (Hull)
2nd Cpl. G. A. Glover, Royal Engineers (Paddington)
Sgt. F. Godley, King's Royal Rifle Corps (Whitwell, Derby)
Battery Sergeant Major P. F. Golding, Royal Garrison Arty. (Kensington)
Sgt. A. T. Goodey, South Staffordshire Reg. (Clapham Common, London)
Sgt. M. Goodwin, Lancashire Fusiliers (Winton Pairieroft)
Sgt. W. J. Goodwin, Rifle Brigade (Brightlingsea)
Sgt. E. Gordon, Royal Engineers (S.R) (Newton-le-Willows, Lancaster)
Cpl. J. Gorman, Royal Engineers (Liverpool)
Sgt. H. Gouldthorpe, Lincolnshire Reg. (Barton-on-Humber)
Pte. J. H. Govan, Scots Guards (Prestonkirk, E. Lothian)
Dvr. C. S. Gowing, Royal Garrison Arty. (Close, near Bristol)
Sgt. W. M. Graham, Royal Garrison Arty. (Peckham)
C.S. Maj. G. R. Graves, Machine Gun Company (Ashted, Birmingham)
Battery Sergeant Major P. E. Gray, Royal Field Arty. (Leicester)
Lance Seaman D. H. Green, Royal Naval Volunteer Reserve (Falkirk)
Cpl. G. H. Green, Royal Field Arty. (Tideswell)
L. Sgt. E. Grey, Welsh Reg. (Swansea)
Sgt. R. A. B. Griffiths, Royal Garrison Arty. (Blackburn)
Sgt. S. Grover, Welsh Reg. (Poitslade)
C.S. Maj. H. R. Groves, East Lancashire Reg. (Poplar, London)
C.Q.M.S. H. Haigh, West Riding Reg. (Greetland, Yorkshire)
Pte. H. Haigh, West Riding Reg. (Lindley, Haddersfield)
Sadd. Staff Sergeant A. Hall, Royal Field Arty. (Brighton)
Sgt. A. E. Hall, Royal Garrison Arty. (Old Walsoken)
Sgt. E. Hall, Middlesex Reg. (Preston, Lancaster)
C.S. Maj. E. W. Hall, Machine Gun Corps (Norwich)
Cpl. L. Hall, West Riding Reg. Stalybridge)
Sgt. S. E. Hall, King's Own Scottish Borderers (Cockerham)
Ftr Cpl. P. Hampson, Royal Garrison Arty. (Birmingham)
C.S. Maj. R. Hanley, Rifle Brigade (Virginia Water)
Spr. J. Hannah, Royal Engineers (Clydeburgh)
C.Q.M.S. G. Hardie, Royal Engineers (Glasgow)
Gnr. C. Harding, Royal Field Arty. (Cardiff)
Gnr. E. Hardman, Royal Garrison Arty. (Waterfoot)
Sgt. P. Hardy, Royal Engineers (Durham)
Cpl. W. H. Harris, Royal Garrison Arty. (Grosvenorroad, London)
Spr. R. G. Harrison, Royal Engineers (Notting Hill)
Sgt. J. R. Harrop, Nottinghamshire and Derbyshire Reg. (Worksop)
Battery Sergeant Major J. Hart, Royal Field Arty. (Hebburn)
C.Q.M.S. C. Hartley, West Yorkshire Reg. (Keighley)
Gnr. M. Hartley, Royal Garrison Arty. (Burnley)
Sgt. A. R. Hervey-Bathurst, Royal Flying Corps (London)
C.Q.M.S. S. M. Haydon, Royal West Kent Reg. (Sandwich)
Sgt. F. J. Haynes, Lancashire Fusiliers (Openshaw, Manchester)
Sgt. J. H. Heath, Middlesex Reg. (Hove, Brighton)
Battery Sergeant Major W. Heath Royal Garrison Arty. (Woodford, Essex)
C.S. Maj. J. Helhwell, Yorkshire Light Inf. (Pontefract)
Dvr. H. Henthorne, Royal Field Arty. (Oldham)
L. Cpl. W. J. Herring, King's Royal Rifle Corps (King's Cross, London)
Sgt. H. E. Hibbard, Honourable Arty. Company (Stoke Newington)
Pte. C. H. Hill, East Lancashire Reg. (Barlowford, Nelson)
Sgt. W. Hill, North Staffordshire Reg. (Wooton, Staffs.)
C.S. Maj. F. Hillier, South Wales Borderers (Newport)
Act. Cpl. G. Hnidle (Preston)
C.S. Maj. A. G. Hiron, London Reg. (Limehouse, London)
Sgt. H. Hirst, West Riding Reg. (Batley)
Dvr. A. G. Hobbs, Royal Field Arty. (Birmingham)
B.Q.M. Sgt. A. Hodgson, Northumberland Fusiliers (Annfield Plain, County Durham)
Sgt. W. W. Hogben, Royal Welsh Fusiliers (Portsmouth)
Sgt. J. Holbrook, Manchester Reg. (Manchester)
Sgt. F. Holliday, Royal Garrison Arty. (Cottingliam)
Act. Battery Sergeant Major Major E. Hollidge, Royal Field Arty. (Upper Tooting)
Sgt. A. E. Holmes, Royal Irish Rifles (Carrickfergus)
L. Cpl. B. Holmes, Royal Warwickshire Reg. (Rugby)
Sgt. F. G. Holmes, Hussars (Candahar Barracks, Tidworth)
C.Q.M.S. F. Holt, Royal Engineers (Wmnick, Northants)
Sgt. J. Holton, Royal Irish Fusiliers (Clonaslea, Queens County)
Sgt. J. Hook, Durham Light Inf. (Durham)
Spr. J. W. Howarth, Royal Engineers (Bolton)
Battery Sergeant Major G. Howell, Royal Field Arty. (Blakeley)
C.S. Maj. W. Howes, Durham Light Inf. (Stockton, Durham)
Dvr. F. T. Howitt, Royal Field Arty. (Aberdeen)
Tmp R.S. Maj. R. A. Hoyle, Lancashire Fusiliers (Bury)
Pte. A. H. Hudson, Royal Warwickshire Reg. (Coventry)
C.S. Maj. R. Hudson, Yorkshire Light Inf. (Normanton)
Pte. J. Hughes, RAMC (Manchester)
Sgt. T. Hughes, Royal Garrison Arty. (Sheerness, Kent)
Sgt. J. E. Humphreys, Royal Field Arty. (Tunstall, Staffs.)
Act. Sgt. G. W. Hunt, Nottinghamshire and Derbyshire Reg. (Nottingham)
Battery Sergeant Major J. Hunt, Royal Garrison Arty. (Higher Broughton, Manchester)
Spr. J. Hunt, Royal Engineers (High Wycombe)
L. Cpl. D. Hunter, Yorkshire Reg. (Bradford)
C.S. Maj. B. H. D. Hurst, Royal Engineers (Bath)
Sgt. E. Hutchms, Machine Gun Corps (Manchester)
Battery Sergeant Major J. C. Ihffe, Royal Garrison Arty. (Wakefield)
Act. C.S. Maj. E. Irving, Coldstream Guards (Walworth, London)
C.Q.M.S. G. Irving, Border Reg. (Waberthwaite)
C.Q.M.S. J. Jacks, Royal Munster Fusiliers (Leeds)
Sgt. J. J. Jackson, Yorkshire Reg. (Stockton-on-Tees)
C.S. Maj. T. Jackson, Machine Gun Corps (Birmingham)
L. Cpl. W. C. Jacobs, Royal Warwickshire Reg. (Stow-on-the-Wold)
Pte. E. Jaoobson, Monmouthshire Reg. (Bristol)
C.S. Maj. G. Jaggs, Essex Reg. (Boxted, near Colchester)
C.S. Maj. A. Jenkins, Worcestershire Reg. (Worcester)
C.S. Maj. E. H. Johns, Royal Engineers (Norwich)
Sgt. E. A. Johnson, Royal Garrison Arty. (Walthamstow)
Cpl. F. W. Johnson, Royal Engineers (Mildmay Park, London)
Pte. T. Johnson, Rifle Brigade (Stockton)
Sgt. S. Johnstone, Scottish Rifles (Whiteinch)
Sgt. A. Jones, Royal Welsh Fusiliers (Wrexham)
Sgt. A. Jones, Machine Gun Corps (Stoke-under-Ham)
L. Cpl. . G. Jones, Duke of Cornwall's Light Inf. (Plaistow)
L. Cpl. J. Jones, Manchester Reg. (Henfeod, S. Wales)
Cpl. J. P. Jones, Royal Garrison Arty. (Birmingham)
R.S. Maj. J. R. Jones  Royal Welsh Fusiliers (Straff ord)
Spr. R. Jones, Royal Engineers (Merioneth)
Act. Staff Sergeant S. Jones, Army Ordnance Corps (Birmingham)
Cpl. T. Jones, West Yorkshire Reg. (Bradford)
Sgt. W. Jones, Machine Gun Corps (Bermondsey, London)
Sqn. S. M. H. Jordison (Northampton)
C.S. Maj. J. Joshua, Welsh Reg. (Maesteg
Sgt. J. W. Judd, Middlesex Reg. (Kingston upon Thames)
C.S. Maj. H. Julsing, Northumberland Fusiliers (Newcastle upon Tyne)
C.S. Maj. J. Kellock, Highland Light Inf. (Glasgow)
Pte. A. Kelly, Manchester Reg. (Manchester)
Pte. E. Kelly, Royal Dublin Fusiliers (Fencehouses, Durham)
Sgt. J. Kelly, Royal Garrison Arty. (Cork)
Sgt. J. S. Kelly, Seaforth Highlanders (Springburn, Glasgow)
Sgt. H. Kendal, Royal Engineers (Bradford)
Sgt. A. Kendall, Royal Garrison Arty. (Brixton)
Battery Sergeant Major C. A. Kendall, Royal Field Arty. (Ilford)
Battery Sergeant Major J. Kennelly, Royal Garrison Arty. (Edinburgh)
Sgt. H. Kent, Royal Garrison Arty. (Malmesbury, Wiltshire)
Pte. A. Kerr, Royal Scots Fusiliers (E. Dumbarton)
Dvr. H. Kirby, Royal Field Arty. (Woodville Derby)
Cpl. H. S. Kirk, Highland Light Inf. (Whiteinch, Glasgow)
Battery Sergeant Major F. A. J. Knight, Royal Field Arty. (Bristol)
L. Cpl. J. W. Knight, Royal Engineers (Southampton)
Cpl. C. Knowles, Duke of Cornwall's Light Inf. (Victoria Park)
L. Cpl. W. Knowlson, West Yorkshire Reg. (Leeds)
Q.M.S. W. Lamkin, RAMC (Ventnor, Isle of Wight)
Fitter Sergeant T. Lancaster, Royal Field Arty. (Workington, Cumberland)
Sgt. J. R. Lang, Shropshire Light Inf. (Edgwareroad, London)
C.S. Maj. E. Langley, Lancashire Fusiliers (Chadderton)
C.Q.M.S. W. T. Large, Cheshire Reg. (Northwich)
C.S. Maj. H. Larkman (Norwich)
C.S. Maj. A. Laurence, Nottinghamshire and Derbyshire Reg. (E. Derby)
L. Cpl. L. C. G. T. Lawford, Mil. Police (Keyhaven, near Lymington, Hampshire)
Spr. R. Lawson, Royal Engineers (Glasgow)
R.S. Maj. O. Lead, North Staffordshire Reg. (Wolstanton, Staffs.)
Sgt. J. W. Leamon, Hampshire Reg. (Woolwich)
Sgt. E. Ledgard, West Yorkshire Reg. (York)
Sgt. S. G. Lee, West Riding Reg. (Marsh, Huddersfield)
Q.M.S. R. G. Leggett, RAMC (Aldershot)
L. Cpl. M. Lennard, Northumberland Fusiliers (Burnhope Co Durham)
Pte. W. Lennon, Lancashire Fusiliers (Piestwick)
Pte. J. Leverton, Duke of Cornwall's Light Inf. (St. Columb, Cornwall)
Pte. J. Lifford, Liverpool Reg. (Fulham)
Sgt. E. Lilley, King's Royal Rifle Corps (New Nuttall, Nottinghamshire)
Sgt. J. S. Lindsay, Army Cyclist Corps (Auchenairn, Bishopbriggs)
Sgt. A. P. Lincoln, Royal Field Arty. (Greater Yarmouth)
Pte. W. C. T. Lloyd, Royal Welsh Fusiliers (Holywell)
R.S. Maj. G. Lockie, South Wales Borderers (Farringdon Rd., London)
Sgt. E. E. Loosemore, Royal Engineers (Bournemouth)
Sgt. J. F. Love, Royal Field Arty. (Parkstone, Dorset)
Cpl. C. E. Lowe, Royal West Surrey Reg. (Barkingside, London)
Cpl. A. G. Ludlow, Royal Fusiliers (Tottenham)
Bombr. W. G. Mabbutt, Headquarters, Royal Field Arty. (Shipston-on-Stour)
Act. Sgt. A. Macaulay, Machine Gun Company (Peith)
Pte. C. E. V. Macdonald, Cav. S.R. (Fort Rose, Ross-shire)
C.S. Maj. B. Maddock, Nottinghamshire and Derbyshire Reg. (Repton, Derby.)
Sgt. A. Macdonald, Seaforth Highlanders (Alness)
C.S. Maj. W. Hackerell, Royal Engineers (Norwich)
Sgt. W. R. MacQueen, Machine Gun Corps (E. London)
Sgt. G. W. Marriott, Royal Field Arty. (Homerton, London)
Sgt. E. Marritt, East Yorkshire Reg. (Hull)
Sgt. H. G. Marsh, Royal West Kent Reg. (Deal)
Act. B.Q.M. Sgt. D. Marshall, Royal Field Arty. (Blackpool)
Sgt. L. T. Marson, Military Mounted Police (Biggleswade, Bedford)
Sgt. J. Martin, Royal Field Arty. (Streatham Hill)
C.S. Maj. J. Martin, Lancashire Fusiliers (Manchester)
Cpl. T. Martin, Royal Engineers (West Hartlepool)
R.S. Maj. B. H. Mathews, Cambridgeshire Reg. (Cambridge)
Gnr. T. C. Matthews, Royal Horse Arty.
Sgt. J. H. Mason, Royal Garrison Arty. (Birkenhead)
Sgt. W. E. Mawbey, Machine Gun Corps (Pimlico, London)
Cpl. R. May, Manchester Reg.
Fitter Sergeant R. Maynard, Royal Field Arty. (Camborne, Cornwall)
C.S. Maj. S. Mayers, Machine Gun Corps (Newport, Isle of Wight)
Sgt. P. McAleavey, Royal Field Arty. (Cleator Moor, Whitehaven)
Cpl. J. McAllister, Royal Engineers (Stirlingshire)
Sgt. D. McAlpine, Highland Light Inf. (Partick/Glasgow)
Pte. F. McCann, Royal West Surrey Reg. (Hammersmith)
Sgt. J. McCarthy, Leinster Reg. (Cork)
Sgt. T. McClure, Royal Garrison Arty. (Thornastown, County Kilkenny)
C.S. Maj. A. A. McDonald, Royal Engineers (Highams Park)
C.S. Maj. J. McDonald, Argyll and Sutherland Highlanders (Argyllshire)
L. Cpl. H. McCann, Royal Engineers (Glasgow)
Pte. J. McEwan, Gordon Highlanders (Dumfries)
Sgt. D. A. McFarlane, Welsh Reg. (Canada)
R.S. Maj. E. McGarry, Lancashire Fusiliers (Oldham)
Act. Bdr E. McGinms, Royal Field Arty. (Springburn, Glasgow)
Sgt. O. McGuinness, Irish Guards (Edgwareroad, London)
Sgt. S. McInnes, Royal Engineers (Thomaby)
C.S. Maj. J. McIntosh, Highland Light Inf. (Newton Grange)
Sgt. S. McIntyre, Royal Garrison Arty. (Millport)
Sgt. W. McKeown, Machine Gun Corps (Glasgow)
Sgt. J. McKintosh, Gordon Highlanders (Aberdeen)
R.S. Maj. J. McLean, Royal Scots Fusiliers (Aberdeen)
Sgt. T. McLeod, Northumberland Fusiliers (Achington)
Sgt. E. McNary, Royal Field Arty. (Wexford)
Staff Sergeant T. McNicol, RAMC (Derby)
Battery Sergeant Major H. Meathrel, Royal Horse Arty. (Devon)
Battery Sergeant Major G. Menzies, Royal Garrison Arty. (Dumbarton)
B.Q.M. Sgt. F. J. Mersh, Hatnps. R. Anerley, London)
Sgt. E. Miles, Royal Engineers (Pontyffym)
C.S. Maj. S. Mills, Worcestershire Reg. (Dudley)
Sgt. C. R. Milton, Scottish Rifles (Ramsgate)
C.S. Maj. R. M. Mitchell, Royal Highlanders (Perth)
Sgt. W. Mitchell, Cameron Highlanders (Taynuilt, Argyll)
Sgt. F. Moles, Machine Gun Corps (New Southgate, London)
Sgt. J. Moody, Machine Gun Corps (Newcastle)
Sgt. J. H. Moody, Rifle Brigade (Rochdale)
Sgt. J. Mooney, King's Own Scottish Borderers (Johnstone)
Sgt. A. T. Moore, Essex Reg. (Leyton)
Pte. F. Moore, Royal Dublin Fusiliers
Cpl. J. Moran, RAMC (Longsight, Manchester)
Cpl. J. F. Morgan, Liverpool Reg. (Liverpool)
Sgt. E. Morris, Lancashire Fusiliers (Higher Ince, Wigan)
Sgt. S. Morris, Royal Engineers (Stafford)
C.S. Maj. G. Moss, Manchester Reg. (Leigh)
Sgt. J. E. Moss, Liverpool Reg. (Liverpool)
Cpl. W. G. Mould, Lancers (Aberaman)
Sgt. W. J. Mulrooney, Royal Engineers (Stoke-on-Trent)
Gnr. F. Munday, Royal Garrison Arty. (Woking)
Battery Sergeant Major J. Munn, Royal Garrison Arty. (Southend)
B.Q.M. Sgt. Major P. S. Munro, Seaforth Highlanders (Edinburgh)
C.S. Maj. F. G. Murphy, Lancashire Fusiliers (Bury)
C.S. Maj. G. Murphy, Labour Corps (Birmingham)
Spr. A. J. Murray, Royal Engineers (Bristol)
Sgt. J. L. Murray, Royal Engineers (Chelsea)
C.S. Maj. H. J. S. Neate, Royal Engineers (Southsea)
Sgt. E. G. Newman, Royal Field Arty. (Boio Green, Kent)
C.S. Maj. T. P. Newman, Royal West Surrey Reg.
C.S. Maj. M. Newton, Royal Lancaster Reg. (Broughton-in-Furness)
C.S. Maj. J. Nicholson, Royal Irish Rifles (Carrickfergus)
Sgt. A. Nickson, North Lancashire Reg. (Preston, Lancaster)
C.S. Maj. J. Norns, Hampshire Reg. (Martyr Worthy, near Winchester)
C.S. Maj. J. O'Brien, Royal Fusiliers (Moirtlake)
Pte. J. Odell, Seaforth Highlanders (Amptjnll)
C.S. Maj. A. O'Nious, South Lancashire Reg. (Douglas, Isle of Man)
Sgt. B. St. C. Owen, Royal Engineers (Bristol)
C.S. Maj. G. Owens, Royal Welsh Fusiliers (Wrexham)
Act. Staff Sergeant H. Owen, Army Ordnance Corps (Bolton)
C.S. Maj. C. E. W. Parish, Machine Gun Corps (Brecon)
Battery Sergeant Major A. Parker, Royal Field Arty. (Clonmel)
C.S. Maj. W. B. Parker, Durham Light Inf. (Bishopwearmouth)
Sgt. W. W. Pass, East Kent Reg. (Darlaston, Staffs.)
C.S. Maj. J. B. Pearce, Royal Engineers (Ilford)
Pte. P. Pearson, Royal Dublin Fusiliers (Dublin)
Sgt. E. Pegg, North Staffordshire Reg. (Fenton, Staffs.)
C.Q.M.S. L. Pegg, Lancashire Fusiliers (Salford)
Pte. H. R. Penan, Machine Gun Corps (Romford, London)
Sgt. W. G. Perkins, Royal Field Arty. (Bristol)
Tmp Staff Sergeant Major J. Peiks, Army Service Corps (Henley-n-Arden)
Cpl. S. Petty, Royal Engineers (Hanogale)
Sgt. J. Phillips, Northumberland Fusiliers (Seaton DeLaval)
Bombr. P. W. Phillips, Royal Garrison Arty. (Walton, Radnorshire)
Cpl. H. O. Pike, Nottinghamshire and Derbyshire Reg. (Manchester)
Sgt. W. Pilkington, East Lancashire Reg. (Accrington)
Sgt. H. Pinder, Royal Engineers (Darwen)
C.S. Maj. E. Pink, Essex Reg. (Enfield)
C.S. Maj. C. B. Plenderleith, Royal Warwickshire Reg. (Birmingham)
L. Cpl. P. Pocock, Military Mounted Police (Edenbridge, Kent)
B.Q.M. Sgt. J. H. Poste, Royal Warwickshire Reg. (Birmingham)
Sgt. H. W. Potter, Manchester Reg. (Fliston)
L. Sgt. J. TPotter, South Lancashire Reg. (St. Helens)
R.S. Maj. W. J. Potter, Manchester Reg. (E. Woolwich)
Sgt. A. Price, Royal Garrison Arty. (Caversham, Oxon.)
Sgt. J. Price, South Lancashire Reg. (Warrington)
Sgt. W. Price, RAMC (Brookend, Glouc.)
Cpl. E. Proctor, Liverpool Reg. (Milnthorpe)
C.S. Maj. Puchas, South Staffordshire Reg. (Brownhills, near Walsall)
C.S. Maj. H. Pugh, Liverpool Reg. (Sandhurst, Cheshire)
R.S. Maj. G. Pullan, Northumberland Fusiliers (Farnley)
2nd Cpl. C. Purdy, Royal Engineers (Langley Hill, Derby)
Battery Sergeant Major W. J. Pye, Royal Field Arty. (Colchester)
Sgt. J. Rands, Royal Field Arty. (Sheffield)
Gnr. A. H. Rankin, Royal Garrison Arty. (Thornhill)
Sgt. W. Banner, Essex Reg. (Southend)
B.Q.M. Sgt. C. Ratcliffe, Royal Field Arty. (Leek, Staffs.)
Pte. W. J. Rawlings, Duke of Cornwall's Light Inf. (St. Austell)
Cpl. F. Read, Royal Engineers (Chippenham)
B.Q.M. Sgt. A. H. Reed, Royal Field Arty. (Lowe-Clapton, London)
Sgt. J. Reeves, Royal Garrison Arty. (Brixton, London)
Sgt. W. Revell, Leicestershire Reg. (Bavenstone, Leics.)
C.S. Maj. W. H. Ricketts, South Wales Borderers (Pontypool)
Bin. A. Richards, King's Royal Rifle Corps (Southampton)
Sgt. D. Richards, Labour Corps (Egremont)
Sgt. W. J. Richards, North Staffordshire Reg. (Rugeley)
Sgt. A. Richardson, Coldstream Guards (Birmingham)
C.S. Maj. C. W. Richardson, Northumberland Fusiliers (Newcastle)
Sgt. G. Richardson, Machine Gun Corps (Ipswich)
Sgt. H. Rider, Royal Field Arty. (Sheffield)
Sgt. S. L. Ridgway, West Riding Reg. (Hadfield, Glossop)
Sgt. G. W. Ridyard, Lancashire Fusiliers (Hightown)
Battery Sergeant Major A. Rimmer, Royal Field Arty. (St. Helens)
Sgt. A. Roberts, Yorkshire Light Inf. (Sheffield)
Sgt. J. Roberts, Monmouthshire Reg. (Talywain, Poratypool, Mon.)
C.S. Maj. W. J. Roberts, Manchester Reg. (Manchester)
Sgt. D. Robertson, Tank Corps (Aberfeldy)
Sgt. W. E. Robertson, Royal Marine Field Arty. (Carlisle)
Act. C.S. Maj. F. Robinson Tank Corps (Bridlington)
Sgt. T. Robinson, Durham Light Inf. (Durham)
Rfn. A. Roe, King's Royal Rifle Corps (Balderton, Newark)
2nd Cpl. J. Rogers, Royal Engineers (Todmorden)
Cpl. S. Rogers, Royal Field Arty. (Wealdstone)
Sgt. H. Rollinson, South Staffordshire Reg. (Bilston, Staffs.)
Sgt. E. A. Rose, Royal Engineers (Thornton Heath)
C.S. Maj. R. Rowan, Highland Light Inf. (Glasgow)
Cpl. W. Rowe, Mil Mounted Police (Castleford, Yorkshire)
Gnr. F. H. Rundle, Royal Garrison Arty. (Plymouth)
Sgt. S. Russell, East Yorkshire Reg. (Elloughton, near Brough, Yorkshire)
C.Q.M.S. S. Salmon, Monmouthshire Reg. (Hammersmith)
Gnr. J. J. Salkeld, Royal Garrison Arty. (Cockermouth)
B.Q.M. Sgt. G. Samson, Worcestershire Reg. (Worcester)
C.S. Maj. F. Sanditson, Royal Fusiliers (Twickenham)
C.S. Maj. A. H. Sands, Royal Marine Light Inf. (Storehouse, Plymouth)
Cpl. J. W. Savage, Royal Engineers (Birmingham)
Cpl. J. W. Savin, Royal Field Arty. (Sedgley, near Dudley)
L. Cpl. J. Scott, Royal Engineers (Liverpool)
C.S. Maj. R. Scott, Middlesex Reg. (Stroud Green, London)
Sgt. H. Scrimshaw, Nottinghamshire and Derbyshire Reg. (Mansfield)
C.Q.M.S. M. A. Searle, Highland Light Inf. (Worrnit, Fifeshire)
C.S. Maj., S. Searle, South Wales Borderers (Peckham, London)
Cpl. E. Seed, Lancashire Fusiliers (Blackburn)
Sgt. J. Seton, Argyll and Sutherland Highlanders (Glasgow)
Sgt. C. J. Shale, Duke of Cornwall's Light Inf. (Coventry)
Cpl. Shoeing-Smith J. Sharp, Royal Field Arty. (Kilmarnock)
Sgt. H. Shaw, Royal Engineers (Musselburgh)
Fitter J. A. Shearer, Royal Field Arty. (Glasgow)
Sgt. F. J. Sheldon, Royal Garrison Arty. (Croydon)
Sgt. J. Shimmings, Coldstream Guards (Holsworthy, Devon.)
Petty Ofc. H. J. Simon, Royal Naval Volunteer Reserve (Hurst, Bixley)
Pte. W. Simpson, Northumberland Fusiliers (West Sleekburn, Bedlington)
B.Q.M. Sgt. R. Sinclair, Royal Garrison Arty. (Leith)
Cpl. H. Singleton, Royal Horse Arty. (Manchester)
Gnr. J. J. R. Singleton, Royal Garrison Arty. (Manchester)
Cpl. S. C. Sircombe, Royal Engineers (Bristol)
Pte. G. Slater, Dragoon Guards (Wmsford)
C.S. Maj. T. W. Slater, Nottinghamshire and Derbyshire Reg. (Matlock, Bath)
Spr. P. A. Sly, Royal Engineers (Sheale)
Sgt. Major H. Smart, Yorkshire Light Inf. (Worcestershire)
Cpl. A. G. Smith, Royal Warwickshire Reg. (Birmingham)
Sgt. A. S. Smith, Royal Field Arty. (Notting Hill Gate)
R.S. Maj. G. F. W. Smith, Dragoon Guards (Battersea)
Cpl. J. H. Smith, Royal Engineers (Peterborough)
Bombr. L. E. Smith, Royal Garrison Arty. (Hanworth)
Act. Cpl. R. Smith, Royal Scots (Armadale)
C.S. Maj. W. Smith, Gordon Highlanders (Clydebank, Glasgow)
Cpl. W. Smith, Royal Engineers (Newport, Mon.)
Sgt. J. V. Solari, Nottinghamshire and Derbyshire Reg., attd. Machine Gun Corps
Sgt. A. Speake, Welsh Reg. (Trealaw)
C.S. Maj. C. Spence, West Yorkshire Reg. (Leeds)
Cpl. C. Spivey, Yorkshire Reg. (Pocklington)
Sgt. E. J. Spriggs, Royal Engineers (Burnham, Somerset)
C.S. Maj. S. Sole, Leicestershire Reg. (Leicester)
Battery Sergeant Major N. F. Spratley, Royal Garrison Arty. (Paddington, London)
Battery Sergeant Major A. Sprott, Royal Field Arty. (Glasgow)
Bombr. W. E. Stay, Royal Garrison Arty. (Rugby)
Sgt. L. Stewart, Royal Field Arty. (Stony Stratford)
Gnr. D. B. Stirling, Machine Gun Corps (Arclgour Wish aw)
2nd Cpl. C. M. Stone, Royal Engineers (Seaford)
C.Q.M.S. R. V. Stone, Royal Engineers (Birmingham)
C.S. Maj. T. A. Stuart, Lincolnshire Reg. (Ashton-under-Lyne)
Cpl. J. Swift, Machine Gun Corps (Wimbledon, Liondon)
L. Cpl. H. Sykes, Yorkshire Light Inf. (Batley)
C.S. Maj. T. Sykes, Yorkshire Light Inf. (Leeds)
Sgt. C. R. Taylor, Royal Garrison Arty. (Highgate Road)
C.Q.M.S. T. Templeton, Royal Engineers (Glengarnock, Ayr)
C.S. Maj. F. A. Terrill, Royal Engineers (Wealds)
Sgt. H. W. Terry, Royal West Kent Reg. (Sevenoaks)
C.S. Maj. W. R. Thomas, Scottish Rifles (Battersea)
Cpl. H. Thompson, Royal Garrison Arty. (Liverpool)
B.Q.M. Sgt.A. C. Thorpe, Royal Field Arty. (Petersfield)
Cpl. C. V. Tighe, Middlesex Reg. (Walthamstow, Essex)
Sgt. W. Timility, Lancashire Fusiliers (Seedley Manchester)
Pte. C. E. Torr, West Yorkshire Reg. (Rotherham)
C.S. Maj. J. R. Tose, West Yorkshire Reg. (York)
B.Q.M. Sgt. P. W. Tranter, Royal Field Arty. (Carlow)
Cpl. A. Travi, Middlesex Reg. (Islington)
Sgt. P. W. Treacher, Royal Garrison Arty. (New-Maiden)
Pte. T. H. Tregunna, Welsh Reg. (Swansea)
Sgt. W. H. Trim, Royal Garrison Arty. (Lambeth)
Sgt. W. G. Trindef, Royal Berkshire Reg. (Windsor)
Sgt. H. Troke, Royal Engineers (Bournemouth)
Sgt. J. W. Trotter, Durham Light Inf. (Durham)
Sgt. F. H. TVyman, North Staffordshire Reg. (Abergavenny)
R.S. Maj. T. G. Upton, Hussars (Preston, Lancaster)
Sgt. A. Utton, East Yorkshire Reg. (Hull)
Sgt. G. Veitch, Machine Gun Corps (Edinburgh)
Sgt. H. C. Vmer, Somerset Light Inf. (London)
Act. Colour Sergeant G. Vyse, East Yorkshire Reg.
Cpl. -Sergeant A. Waddell, Argyll and Sutherland Highlanders (Bothkennar, Stirlingshire)
Gnr. M. J. Wagner, Royal Field Arty. (Liverpool)
C.S. Maj. C. F. Walker, Bedfordshire Reg. (Hitchin)
C.S. Maj. J. Wallis, Lincolnshire Reg. (Grimsby)
Sgt. G. Walmesley, Machine Gun Corps (Bradford)
Sgt. J. Wareing, North Lancashire Reg. (Bolton)
Cpl. E. J.Warwick, Royal Engineers (Pontycymmer)
Sgt. J. A. Wassell, Royal Engineers (Fareham, Hampshire)
Sgt. J. Waters, Northumberland Fusiliers (Gosforth)
Pte. G. Watson, Scots Guards (Kirkonhill-by-Montrose)
Sgt. W. Watson, Highland Light Inf. (Dundee)
Sgt. F. W. Watt, Tank Corps (Aberdeen)
L. Cpl. H. Watts, Traffic Control Squadron (Dovercourt, Essex)
L. Cpl. P. Wearn, Wiltshire Reg. (Brockenhurst, Hampshire)
Cpl. G. Webster, South Lancashire Reg. (St. Helens)
Sgt. W. Webster, Royal Engineers (Ashby-de-la-Zouch)
C.S. Maj. H. Weedon, Royal Fusiliers (Homerton)
Cpl. H. F. Welfare, Northumberland Fusiliers (Newcastle)
L. Cpl. W. J. Welham, East Lancashire Reg. (Willesden, London)
2nd Cpl. W. Wells, Royal Engineers (Alford, Surrey)
Sgt. A. G. Wenden, Royal Garrison Arty. (Kingston, Portsmouth)
Sgt. G. White, Royal Field Arty. (Liverpool)
Sgt. H. Whitmore, Royal Garrison Arty. (W. Hampstead)
Sgt. H. A. White, Tank Corps (Reading)
Sgt. H. Whitfield, Yorkshire Reg. (Sledmere)
Air Mechanic Sergeant Major F. Whittaker, Tank Corps (Manchester)
Sgt. F. Whittaker, Royal Field Arty. (Sowerby Bridge, Yorkshire)
Sgt. T. Whitton, Machine Gun Corps (Edinburgh)
C.S. Maj. J. Wicken, Royal West Kent Reg. (North Woolwich)
Sgt. H. G. Wickington, East Kent Reg. (Haggerston, London)
Sgt. P. Wicks, Royal Horse Arty. (Wellhall, London)
Cpl. A. Widdowson, Royal Field Arty. (E. Wakefield)
Sgt. L. C. Wildig, Royal Field Arty. (Bethnal Green, London)
R.S. Maj. A. Wileman, North Lancashire Reg.
Sgt. J. Wilkinson, East Lancashire Reg. (Burnley)
C.S. Maj. W. S. Wilkinson, West Riding Reg. (Holmfirth, Huddersfield)
C.S. Maj. E. G.Williams, Duke of Cornwall's Light Inf. (Brixton)
Cpl. F. Williams, North Lancashire Reg. (Horwich)
L. Cpl. F. Williams, Royal Engineers (Manchester)
L. Sgt. I. Williams, Welsh Reg. (Bridgend)
C.Q.M.S. P. Williams, Royal Munster Fusiliers (Abertndwr)
Cpl. S. A. Williams, Royal Engineers (Smethwick)
Sgt. W. T. Williams, Middlesex Reg. (Hornsey, London)
L. Cpl. H. Willicombe, Rifle Brigade (Camberwell)
Dvr. A. A. Willis, Royal Garrison Arty. (Apperley, near Tewkesbury)
B.Q.M. Sgt. J. Willis, Royal Garrison Arty. (Kensington)
Sgt. H. Willmer, Royal Garrison Arty. (Homerton, London)
Sgt. W. Willows, West Riding Reg. (Colne)
L. Sgt. H. Wilshaw, Nottinghamshire and Derbyshire Reg. (Chapel-en-le-Frith)
Sgt. A. P. Wilson, Bedfordshire Reg. (Luton)
R.S. Maj. J. W. Windmill, Royal Warwickshire Reg. (Brierley Hill)
Cpl. H. Withers, Royal Field Arty. (Muswell Hill, London)
Sgt. A. Wood, Essex Reg. (Warley)
Cpl. H. Wood, Royal Field Arty.
C.S. Maj. H. C. Woodger, East Lancashire Reg. (Banning, Kent)
Sgt. H. Woodhams, East Kent Reg. (Northampton)
Battery Sergeant Major E. Woodruff, Royal Field Arty. (Blackburn)
Cpl. F. Woode, Royal Engineers (Maidenhead, Bucks)
Battery Sergeant Major J. H. Woods, Royal Field Arty. (Battersea)
Sgt. C. E. K. Wordingham, Suffolk Reg. (Railway, Cambs)
Fitter Q.M.S. J. W.Worth, Royal Field Arty. (Newcastle upon Tyne)
Sgt. F. E. Wright, Royal Engineers (Darlington)
Cpl. F. W. Wright, Royal Scots (Edinburgh)
Sgt. W. J. Wright, Royal Field Arty. (Pembroke)
C.S. Maj. T. G. Yearsley, Monmouthshire Reg. (Aberearn, Mon.)
Sgt. W. H. Zanazi, Royal Engineers (Plymouth)
Sgt. J. R. Adamson, Yorkshire Reg. (East Rainton)
Petty Ofc. J. Allan, Royal Naval Volunteer Reserve (Annitsford)
Act. Bombr. S. A. Blyth, Royal Garrison Arty. (Melton, Norfolk)
2nd Cpl. F. Bownas, Royal Engineers (E. Bradford)
L. Cpl. L. J. Burden, Tank Corps (Bridgtown)
Sgt. A. Cole, South Wales Borderers (Withington Station, near Hereford)
L. Cpl. M. Dixon, Shropshire Light Inf. (Gelli, Rhondda)
Battery Sergeant Major F. W. H. Eastley, Royal Garrison Arty. (Southampton)
Spr. W. J. Feeman, Royal Engineers (Liverpool)
R.S. Maj. A. Ferrier, Royal Highlanders (Perth)
Cpl. F. Fisher, Royal Field Arty. (Wetley, Hampshire)
Cpl. G. C. Gane, Somerset Light Inf. (Shepton Mallet)
Spr. W. I. Garner, Royal Engineers (Bletchley)
C.S. Maj. E. Hall, Middlesex Reg. (Preston, Lancaster)
L. Cpl. G. Hardie, Royal Engineers (Glasgow)
Spr. R. Harrison, Royal Engineers (Notting Hill)
Sgt. R. Harrop, Nottinghamshire and Derbyshire Reg. (Worksop)
Dvr. H. Henthorn, Royal Field Arty. (Oldham)
Cpl. G. Hindle, East Lancashire Reg. (Preston)
L. Sgt. W. W. Hogben, Royal Welsh Fusiliers (Portsmouth)
C.S. Maj. E. Irving, Coldstream Guards (Walworth, London)
C.Q.M.S. I. Jacks, Royal Munster Fusiliers (Leeds)
Act. Cpl. F. G. Jones, Duke of Cornwall's Light Inf. (Plaistow)
C.S. Maj. H. Larkman, Essex Reg. (Norwich)
Sgt. L. T. Marsom, Military Mounted Police (Biggleswade, Bedford)
Sgt. J. McIntosh, Gordon Highlanders (Aberdeen)
Sgt. S. S. Morris, Royal Engineers (Stafford)
Pte. H. R. Periam, Machine Gun Corps (Romford, London)
Sgt. A. Roberts, Yorkshire Light Inf. (Talywain, Pontypool, Mon.)
L. Cpl. I. Scott, Royal Engineers (Liverpool)
Sgt. J. V. Solari, Nottinghamshire and Derbyshire Reg., attd. Machine Gun Corps
Battery Sergeant Major H. F. Spratley, Royal Garrison Arty. (Paddington, London)
R.S. Maj. A. Utton, East Yorkshire Reg. (Hull)
Clr.Sergeant G. Vyse, East Yorkshire Reg.
C.S. Maj. C. F. Walker, Bedfordshire Reg. (Hitchin)
C.Q.M.S. H. G. Wickington, East Kent Reg. (Haggerston, London)
Sgt. P. J. Wicks, Royal Horse Arty. (Wellhall, London)
L. Cpl. F. E. Wright, Royal Engineers (Darlington)

Australian Imperial Force
Pte. A. J. Breen, Inf.
Tmp Cpl. B. W. Rickwo, Inf.
E. H. Wiber, T.M. Brigade
Sgt. E. A. W. Adams, Inf.
C.S. Maj. A. E. Adams, Inf.
Sgt. V. J. Barkell, Inf.
Spr. E. L. Barrett, Engineers
Pte. T. Bayne, Inf.
Pte. H. Beaird, Inf.
Sgt. D. F. Berman, Inf.
V. Berriman, Arty.
Cpl. L. Berry, Inf.
Sgt. J. R. Birthisel, Inf.
Pte. S. H. Brazil, Inf.
Pte. J. A. Breen, Inf.
Gnr. D. G. Brough, Field Arty.
Sgt. J. R. Butler, Inf.
Sgt. R. A. F. Campbell, Inf.
C.S. Maj. H. M. Cook, Inf.
Cpl. H. F. Eagle, Field Arty.
Sgt. A. W. Farmer, Inf.
Sgt. R. P. Farris, Inf.
Cpl. A. Flavell, Inf.
Sgt. S. Fountain, Engineers
Sgt. C. E. Free, Inf.
R.S. Maj. R. Gray, Inf.
Sgt. L. G. Howe, Engineers
Sgt. L. G. Jarvis, Inf.
Sgt. J. H. Leach, Inf.
2nd Cpl. L. T. J. Marshall, Engineers
Sgt. Major A. E. McDonald, Field Arty.
Staff Sergeant A. V. D. Moody, Engineers
2nd Cpl. J. L. Mounsey, Eng
Sgt. B. F. Murphy, Inf.
Sgt. D. T. W. Neville, Inf.
L. Cpl. F. J. Perry, Inf.
Cpl. J. Printer, Salvage Company
Cpl. T. G. Purdue, Gar. Arty.
L. Cpl. J. Reilly, Inf.
Bombr. W. H. Ramsden, Field Arty.
Tmp Cpl. W. B. Rickwood, Inf.
Sgt. H. Shatwell, Inf.
Pte. T. Smith, Inf.
Sgt. G. Taylor, Pioneer Battalion
Spr. R. G. Thomas, Engineers
Sgt. F. T. Trevaskis, Pioneer Battalion
R.S. Maj. A. J. Vallis, Inf.
C.Q.M.S. F. Walker, Machine Gun Corps
Cpl. C. G. Watson, Inf.
L. Sgt. F. A. Wheaton, Inf.
Cpl. H. E. Wiber, T. M. Brigade
Pte. J. D. Walks, Army Medical Corps
C.S. Maj. S. Wilson, Inf.

Canadian Force
Sgt. P. H. Law, Field Arty.
C.S. Maj. H. Adam, Inf.
Cpl. J. D. Aird, Mounted Rifles
C.S. Maj. C. Baker, Inf.
Sgt. W. J. Bassey, Inf.
Sgt. H. M. Bennett, Engineers
C.S. Maj. R. Blair, Inf.
C.S. Maj. F. J. Bonner, Inf.
Sgt. E. J. Bridgwater, Engineers
Cpl. J. Bullock, Inf.
Sgt. J. Burns, Inf.
C.S. Maj. H. T. Carter, Inf.
Sgt. C. L. Cooling, Engineers
Sgt. J. Craig, Engineers
R.S. Maj. R. Dalrymple, Inf.
Bombr. F. Donald, Gar. Arty.
Sgt. T. A. Dunseath, Inf.
Act. C.S. Maj. G. W. Durran, Inf.
Sgt. E. Ensor, Inf.
C.S. Maj. E. Evans, Inf.
Battery Sergeant Major S. C. Evans, Arty.
Sgt. E. J. Field, Inf.
Sgt. A. H. Frame, Field Arty.
Sgt. J. Goulding, Railway Troops
Pte. J. H. Gulliver, Inf.
Sgt. J. M. Hay, Machine Gun Corps
Spr. J. W. Holmes, Engineers
C.S. Maj. G. L. Howard, Mounted Rifles
R.S. Maj. W. T. Johnson, Inf.
B.Q.M. Sgt. D. McN. Johnstone, Inf.
Sgt. A. J. Kirouac, Inf.
Act. Sgt. H. W. Langdon, Inf.
Sgt. P. H. Law, Field Arty.
Sgt. J. N. Lyons, Gar. Arty.
C.S. Maj. A. MacAlay, Inf.
Battalion Scout Sergeant J. L. MacCoubrey, Mounted Rifles
L. Cpl. J. Mackay, Inf.
Battery Sergeant Major A. K. McDonald, Field Arty.
Sgt. W. L. McLean, Mounted Rifles
Sgt. D. McLellan, Pioneer Battalion
L. Cpl. W. J. Mead, Mounted Rifles
T. P. Melvin, Field Arty.
Sgt. W. A. Millen, Inf.
Cpl. H. L. Montgomery, Cyclist Battalion
Sgt. T. W. Morgan, Inf.
Pte. W. R. Mowll, Inf.
C.S. Maj. J. Mutimer, Inf.
Sgt. C. H. Olson, Railway Troops
C.S. Maj. J. H. Patton, Machine Gun Corps
Sgt. W. L. Paul, Inf.
Cpl. C. E. Penrod, Field Arty.
Sgt. A. Powell, Engineers
C.S. Maj. D. M. Robinson, Inf.
C.S. Maj. J. Shefly, Inf
Sgt. Warrant Ofc. Simpson, Engineers
Sgt. W. D. Street, Inf.
Pte. R. Taylor, Machine Gun Corps
Sgt. Major J. Turner, Army Medical Corps
Sgt. J. A. Ware, Gar. Arty.
Sgt. J. Watson, Army Medical Corps
C.S. Maj. J. H. Wyatt, Inf.
Sgt. G. M. Young, Inf.

New Zealand Force
Pte. N. D. Bowman, Inf.
Cpl. W. W. Bullock, Inf.
Pte. V. Cruickshank, Inf.
L. Sgt. J. Densem, Rifle Brigade
Gnr. A. S. Driver, Field Arty.
Sgt. F. Greig, Field Arty.
R.S. Maj. W. A. Gustafson, Pioneers
L. Sgt. S. N. Managh, Rifle Brigade
Sgt. J. McCreanor, Inf.
Cpl. K. McKenzie, Inf.
Sgt. A. W. M. Ohlson, Rifle Brigade
Sgt. H. W. Price, Machine Gun Corps
L. Cpl. L. R. Ritchie, Inf.
Dvr. S. Wade, Field Arty.

Newfoundland Contingent
C.S. Maj. A. Taylor, Newfoundland Reg.

South African Force
Bombr. E. C. Tys, Royal Marine Arty.

Meritorious Service Medal (MSM)

Military Medal (MM)

Indian Order of Merit (IOM)
Second Class
Lance Dafadar Anokh Singh, Cav.
Dafadar Puran Singh, Cav.

Indian Distinguished Service Medal (IDSM) 
Dvr. Alia Dad, Royal Horse Arty.
Dvr. Lehna Singh, Royal Horse Arty.
Sowar Man Singh Cav.
Sowar Mool Singh, Cav.
Dafadar Bhoor Singh, Cav.
Lance Dafadar Ali Hassan, Cav.
Dafadar Atta Muhammad Khan, Cav.
Act. Lee Dafadar Sobha Singh, Cav.
Sowar Rati Ram, Cav.
Risaldar Khurshed Muhammad Khan, Cav.
Act. Dafadar Parbhu Dayal, Cav.
Sowar Jaimal Singh, Cav.
Lance Dafadar Niadar Singh, Cav.
Jemadar Kale Khan, Cav.
Risaldar Tek Singh, Cav.
Jemadar Habib Gul, Cav.
Jemadar Sardar Khan, Cav.
Dafadar Abdul Satar Khan, Cav.
Lance Dafadar Nawab All Khan, Cav.
Sowar Sarain Singh, Cav.
Dafadar Sangar Khan, Cav.
Sowar Fauja Singh, Cav.
Jemadar Alam Sher, Cav.
Jemadar Adalat Khan, Cav.
Jemadar Khuda Baksh Khan, Cav.
Dafadar Alia Ditta Khan, Cav.
Sowar Muhammad Jan, Cav.
Act. Lance Dafadar Bur Singh, Cav.
Act. Lance Dafadar Musali Khan, Cav.
Dafadar Ram Sarup, Cav.
Sowar Mir Ronak All, Cav.
Sowar Autar Singh, Cav. Ward Ordly
Mahmud Ali Khan, Cav.
Sowar Asta Buddin, Cav. Ressalder Balwant Singh, Cav.
Dafadar Abdur Rahim Khan, Cav.
Dafadar Dale Ram, Cav.
Dafadar Pirthi Singh, Cav. Jemadar Anno Khan, Cav.
Jemadar Taj Muhammad Khan, Cav.
Dafadar Sher Bahadur Khan, Cav.
Dafadar Jehan Khan, Cav.
Lance Dafadar Akram Khan, Cav.
Dafadar Khandara Singh, Cav.
Dafadar Labh Singh, Cav.
Act. Lee. Dafadar Arjan Singh, Cav.
Sowar Nand Singh, Cav.
Havildar Kala Singh, Royal Garrison Arty., Indian Army
Ward Ordly. Umrao Singh, Inf.
1st Grade Hospital Store Keeper Rup Chand Khana, Supply and Transport Corps
Sub. Asst Surg Parmanand Misra, Indian Sub. Medical Service
1st Class Sub. Asst Surg George Julian Ferris, Indian Sub. Medical Service
1st Class Sub Asst Surgeon Ram Lai Abrole, Indian Sub. Medical Service
Lance Havildar Budhoo, Army Bearer Corps
Bearer Binda, Army Bearer Corps

King's Police Medal (KPM)

England and Wales

Police Forces
Lt.-Col. The Hon. George Augustus Anson  Chief Constable of Staffordshire
George Morley, Chief Constable of Hull
James Anniwell, Superintendent and Deputy Chief Constable of the Bedfordshire Constabulary
Henry Hand, Superintendent and Deputy Chief Constable of the Breconshire Police
Superintendent John H. Gillbanks, of the Somersetshire Police
Superintendent Patrick Quinn  of the Metropolitan Police Force
Sgt. Staple, of the Somersetshire Police Force
Constable Alfred Bence, of the Metropolitan Police Force
Constable Herbert Bradbury, of the Lancashire Constabulary
Constable Charles Dednum, of the Metropolitan Police Force
Constable James Hardacre, of the Lancashire Constabulary
Constable James Hardy, of the Metropolitan Police Force
Constable John Nelson Kent, of the Blackpool Police Force
Constable Ambrose Jolleys, of the Lancashire Constabulary
Constable Matthew Landy, of the Metropolitan Police Force
Constable George Legrove, of the City of London Police Force
Constable Charles Penn, of the Metropolitan Police Force
Constable Augustus Ralph, of the Metropolitan Police Force
Constable Robert George Wilson, of the Metropolitan Police Force

Fire Brigades
Chief Ofc. Edward James Abbott, of the Barking Fire Brigade
Fireman James Joseph Betts, West Ham Fire Brigade
Station Ofc. Samuel Scott Betts, West Ham Fire Brigade
Fireman Henry Chappie, West Ham Fire Brigade
Sub-Ofc. Landias Mathunn, West Ham Fire Brigade
First-Class Fireman Ernest Milsted, West Ham Fire Brigade
Fireman Frederick Charles Sell, West Ham Fire Brigade
Fireman James Henry Rich Yabsley, West Ham Fire Brigade
Sub-Ofc. Henry Vickers, West Ham Fire Brigade

Scotland

Police Forces
Constable William Tair Brown, of the Glasgow City Police Force
Charles George, Chief Constable of Kincardine

Fire Brigades
Firemaster William Inkster, of the City of Aberdeen

Ireland

Police Forces
Robert John O'Sullivan, Acting Sergeant of the Royal Irish Constabulary 
John Fitzhugh Gelston, County Inspector of the Royal Irish Constabulary
Fergus Quinn, Assistant Comm., Dublin Metropolitan Police
William P. Bannon, Superintendent of the Dublin Metropolitan Police
Sgt. James Gunn, of the Royal Irish Constabulary
Constable Michael Barry, of the Royal Irish Constabulary
Constable Daniel Brennan, of the Dublin Metropolitan Police
Constable Patrick Downing, of the Dublin Metropolitan Police
Constable Alexander McDonald, of the Royal Irish Constabulary

Awarded a Bar to the King's Police Medal
Sgt. John Barton, of the Dublin Metropolitan Police

British India

Police Forces
Walter Henry Wright, Assistant Superintendent of Police, Madras Police 
Golla Simhachellam, Sub-Inspector of Police, Godavari district, Madras Police 
Abdul Aziz Sahib, Inspector of Police, Godavari district, Madras Police 
Nandi Kishora Padhi, Inspector of Police, Vizagapatam district, Madras Police 
Roy Havelock Haslam, Assistant Superintendent, Agency Police, Kathiawar, Bombay Police 
Rajabkhan Daudkhan, Fourth Grade Head Constable in the Kaira District Police, Bombay Police
Peter Sullivan, Superintendent of the Criminal Investigation Dept., Bombay City Police
Abdul Satar Khan walad Sobdar Khan, Inspector of Police, Fourth Grade, Karachi District (acting Third Grade), Bombay Police
MalayActing Ganpat, Acting Second Grade Inspector of Police in the Poona District, Bombay Police
Khan Saheb Imam Muhammad, a Third Grade Inspector of Police, Criminal Investigation Dept., Bombay Presidency
Gerald Sidney Wilson, Deputy Comm. of Police for the part of Bombay
Ganu Dhansrng, a Second Grade Head Constable, District East Khandesh (retired)
Nalini Nath Mazumdar, Inspector, Calcutta Police, Bengial Police
Sashi Bhusan Bhattacharji, Inspector of Police, Bengal
Rajemdra Nath Basu, Inspector of Police, Bengal 
Narendra Nath Mukharji, Sub-Inspector of Police, Bengal
Jamir Khan, Constable, Bengal Police
Robert Martin Wright, Superintendent of Police, Bengal
Amrita Lai Singh, Head Constable, Calcutta Police
Azam Khan, Head Constable, Bengal Police
Ram Sakal Gosain, Head Constable, Bengal Police
Jogendra Chandra Gupta, Sub-Inspector of Police, Intelligence Branch, Criminal Investigation Dept., Bengal Police
Ala Ahmad, Constable of the Budaun district, United Provinces Police
Bhagwant Singh, Sub-Inspector, Station Ofc. of Islamnagarthana, Budaun District, United Provinces Police
Muhammad Khan, Constable of the Kheri district, United Provinces Police
George Grosvenor Bruce Iver, Superintendent of Police, Jheilum district, Punjab Police
Mohammad Rashid, Head Constable, Ferozepore district, Punjab Police
Haider Ali, Sub-Inspector, Ludhiana district, Punjab Police
Faiz-ul-Hassan, Sub-Inspector, Punjab Police
Mirza Muraj-ud-Din, Inspector, Punjab Police
Malcolm James Chisholm, Deputy Inspector-General of Police for Railways and Criminal Investigation, Burma Civil Police
Charles Arthur Reynell, District Superintendent of Police Henzada, Burma Civil Police
Sita Ram, Deputy Superintendent of Police, Burma Civil Police
Maung Kyaung Ba  Inspector of Police (retired), Burma Civil Police
Pahalman Chettri, 1st Grade Jemadar, Arakan Hill Tracts Military Police Battalion, Burma Military Police
Arratoon Catchick, Deputy Superintendent of Police, Officiating District Superintendent of Police, Kathia, Burma Civil Police
Henry St. John Morrison, Deputy Superintendent of Police, Bihar and Orissa, Civil Police
Swarup Narayan Singh, Jamadar, Military Police Company, Bhagalpur, Bihar and Orissa Military Police
Khwaja Muhammad Akram Khan, Deputy Superintendent, Central Provinces Police
Singfair Gharti, Subadar Lushai Hills Military Police Battalion, Assam Military Police
Khan Sahib Helimulla, Officiating Deputy Superintendent of Police, Sylhet district, Assam Civil Police
Jangbir Lama, Subadar, Lakhimpur Military Police Battalion, Assam Military Police
Eric Charles Handyside, Superintendent of Police, 4th Grade, North-West Frontier Province Police
Zabhir Gul Khan, Inspector, 4th grade, North-West Frontier Province Police
Malik Mazaffar Khan, Inspector, 3rd grade, North-West Frontier Province Police
Thomas Henry Morony, District Superintendent of Police, 4th grade, Indian Police (Indore State Police)
Samuel Thomas Hollins, Superintendent of Police, 5th grade, Inspector-General of Tonk State Police
Adalat Khan, Head Constable, Baluchistan Police
Ernest Woodburn Trotter, District Superintendent, Burma Civil Police
Reginald Charles Whiting, District Superintendent, Burma Civil Police

Overseas Dominions

Police Forces
James Frendo Azopardi  Senior Assistant Superintendent of Police, Malta 
William Kilmuster Notley, Comm. of Police, East Africa Protectorate 
Lt.-Col. Charles Riddick, Comm. of Police and Prisons, Uganda Protectorate 
Robert Evans Lett, Staff Instructor, Gold Coast Police
Col. William Eden Clark, Inspector-General of Police and Commandant of local forces, British Guiana

Imperial Service Medal (ISM)

Home Civil Service
William Addis, Overseer, London Postal Service
Walter Alfred Barnes, First Class Messenger, Treasury
Frederick John Bayfield, Detail Plotter, Publication Division, Ordnance Survey, Southampton
George Bennett, Postman, Mitcham
Alfred Biffen, Overseer, London Postal Service
John Blackwood, Postman, Kinross
William Thomas Blake, Foreman, Army Ordnance Dept., Woolwich
Samuel Francis Boden, Postman, Birmingham
Owen Sylvester Bond, Shipwright, Portsmouth Dockyard
Frederick William Bucknell, Overseer (Telegraphs), London Postal Service
Valentine Pike Burbidge, Assistant Head Postman, London Postal Service
Alma Ephraim Austin Burden, Second Class Draughtsman (Overseer), Portsmouth Dockyard
James Burke, Preventive Ofc., Liverpool
Francis Burns, Postman, Portadown
Thomas Butland, Assistant Inspector of Postmen, Torquay
John Butler, Leading Man of Wharf, Royal Clarence Yard, Gosport
William Woodward Butler, Postman, Ganstead, S.O. Hull
Duncan Urquhart Brown, First Engineer (Yardcraft), Portsmouth Dockyard
Alfred John Carter, Assistant Inspector of Postmen, Exeter
John Caryl, Postman, Cowley SO., Exeter
George Chadwick, Assistant London Postal Service Head Postman
Benjamin Walter Samuel Chambers, Telegraphist, Central Telegraph Office
Richard William Chapman, Sorting Clerk and Telegraphist, Leeds
Christopher Byatt Comben, Warder, Portland Prison
Ellen Cooke, Matron, Class IV, Shrewsbury Prison
Richard John Cooper, Principal Warder, Portland Prison
Thomas John Cooper, Patternmaker, Chatham Dockyard
James Crone, Chief Worktaker, Central Office, Ministry of Munitions
Stephen Richard Davey, Shipwright, Devon-port Dockyard
Emily Rosa Davies, Assistant Supervisor, Class II, Central Telegraph Office
Ernest John Edward Davis, Postman, Portsmouth
John Dixon, Postman, Preston
Frederick William Drew, Examiner of Drawings, Control Division, Ordnance Survey, Southampton
Joseph Drinkwater, Postman, Gloucester
William Berry Dyson, Assistant Inspector of Postmen, Huddersfield
James Farrar, Assistant Inspector, Post Office, Blackburn
Arthur Fewell, Assistant Inspector, Post Office, Sutton
William Gamwell, Postman, Northallerton
William Garwood, Stamper, Office of Inspector of Stamping, Inland Revenue
James Richard Ernest Gaston, Postman, London Postal Service
Giovanni Gatt, Foreman of Stores, Naval Store Dept., Admiralty
Andrew Gibson, Postman, Belfast
William Grave, Overseer (Postal), Liverpool
Richard Horatio Green, Assistant Inspector of Tracing, Accountant-General's Dept., General Post Office
George Edward Harris, Postman, Harlow
George Harvey, Postman, Gloucester
William John Head, Second Class Storerman, Stores Dept., General Post Office
James Heard, Shipwright, Chatham Dockyard
Thomas Hennessy, Postman, Kildare, Newbridge, Ireland
Charles Samuel Hill, Mate in charge of War Dept. Vessels, War Office
William Sycamore Hill, Postman, Sutton
Jessie Eliza Housden, Sorting Clerk and Telegraphist, Wimborne
Joseph Hudson, Postman, Warwick
Gabriel Hughes, Inspector of Messengers, Central Telegraph Office
Edward Jones, Postman, Liverpool
Robert Jones, Shipwright, Pembroke Dockyard
Edwin James Lake, Skilled Labourer, Portsmouth Dockyard
Robert Lawson, Postman, Glasgow
William Thomas Leonard, Postman, Rochdale
Mary Elizabeth Liddle, Assistant Supervisor, Post Office, Carlisle
George William Lock, Telegraphist, Central Telegraph Office
Mary Lomax, Sorting Clerk and Telegraphist, Manchester
George William Long, Sorting Clerk and Telegraphist, Boston
Henry Lord, Preventive Ofc., Sunderland
Edward Lovell, Postman, Eastbourne
Andrew Low, Inspector of Storehousemen, Chatham Dockyard
Patrick M'Donnell, Postman, Slane, Drogheda
James M'Geoch, Inspector, Engineering Dept., General Post Office
Daniel M'llgorm, Customs and Excise Ofc., Holyhead, Carnarvon
Arthur Samuel Madge, Sorter, London Postal Service
William Mash, Rigger (Chargeman), Sheerness Dockyard
Walter Mason, Paper-Keeper, Money Order Dept., General Post Office
David Millar, Postman, Coatbridge
James Nelson, Postman, Crossgar, Belfast
William Newburn, Shipwright, Chatham Dockyard
William Noot, Shipwright, Pembroke Dockyard
William Parsons, Warder, Grade I, Brixton Prison
Charles Henry Penrose, Ship Fitter, Devonport Dockyard
Harry Perks, Assistant Inspector of Postmen, Buxton
Thomas Reekie, Postman, Auchtermuchty, Ladybank
Arthur James Richards, Fitter, Chatham Dockyard
Ralph Robinson, Overseer, Post Office, Stockton-on-Tees
Alfred Robert Rose, Sorter, London Postal Service
John Sandham, Postman, Fleetwood
Elizabeth Scowcroft, Telegraphist, Central Telegraph Office
William Kinnear Shannon, Postman, Dundee
Edna Jane Sharpe, Matron, Class I, Leeds Prison
William Shearman, Postman, York
Margaret Sheret, Counter Clerk and Telegraphist, London Postal Service
George Sinclair, Head Office Keeper and House Keeper, Foreign Office
Charles Smith, Postman, London Postal Service
George Henry Smith, Shipwright, Devonport Dockyard
William Stewart, Skilled Labourer, Devonport Dockyard
Robert Scott Taylor, Labourer, Leeds Prison
Robert Tillett, Shipwright, Portsmouth Dockyard
John Thomas Tozer, Skilled Labourer, Devonport Dockyard
William Richard Upjohn, Postman, Lyme Regis, S.O. Axminster
William Wardrop, Foreman, Engineering Dept., General Post Office
Frances Mary Isabella Webber, Assistant Supervisor (Telegraphs), Bath
Charles Arthur Wells, Examiner of Tracings, Control Division, Ordnance Survey, Southampton
Alfred George White, Sorter, London Postal Service
Henry James Whittle, Telegraphist, Central Telegraph Office
Edward Whitwell, Postman, Kendal
Joseph William Wickenden, Skilled Labourer, Sheerness Dockyard
Alfred John Wilkins, Photographic Writer, Publication Division, Ordnance Survey, Southampton
Edwin Williams, Ship Fitter, Chargeman, Devonport Dockyard

References

New Year Honours
1918 awards
1918 in Australia
1918 in Canada
1918 in India
1918 in New Zealand
1918 in the United Kingdom